= Vilnius =

Capital and largest city of Lithuania

- Capital city
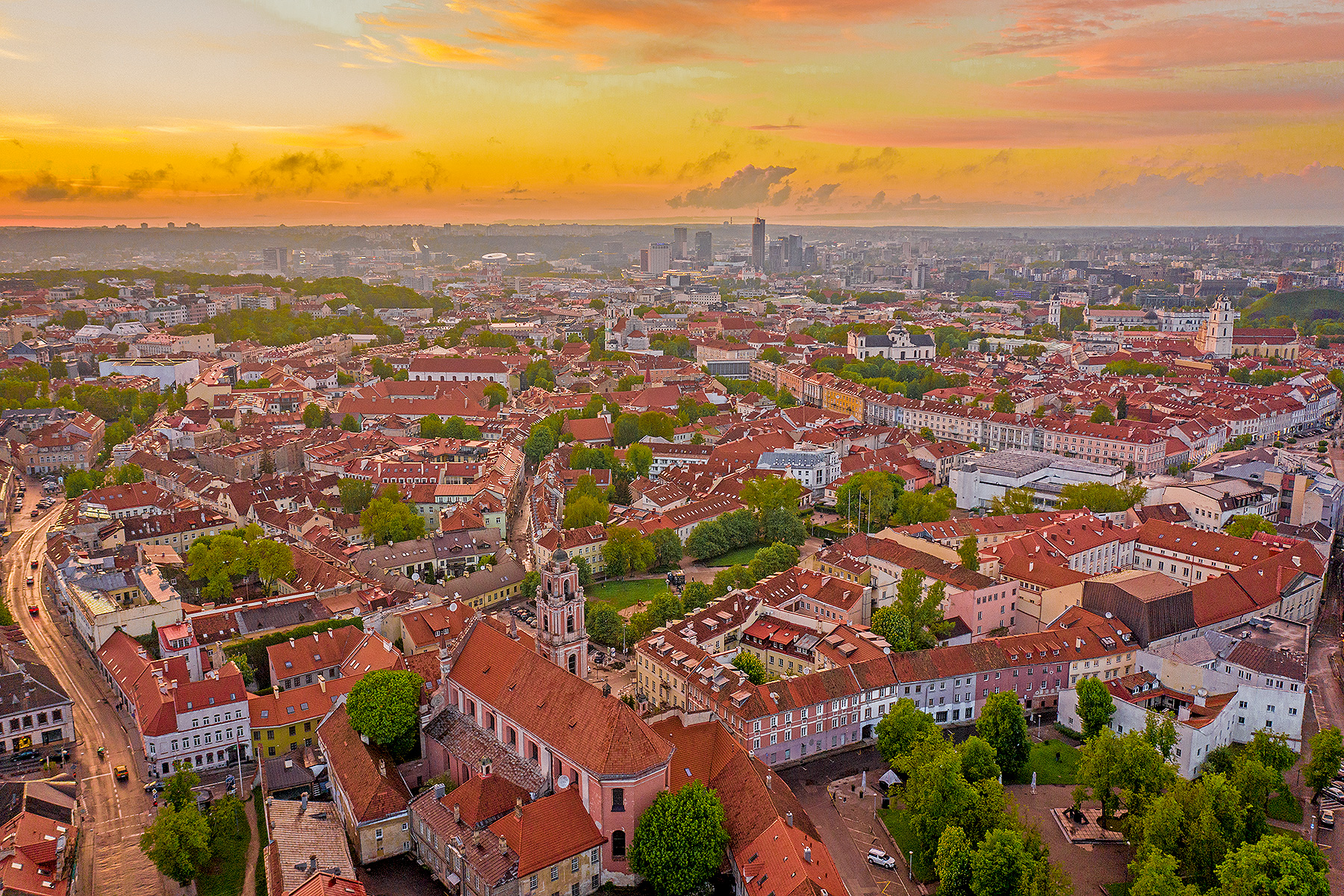
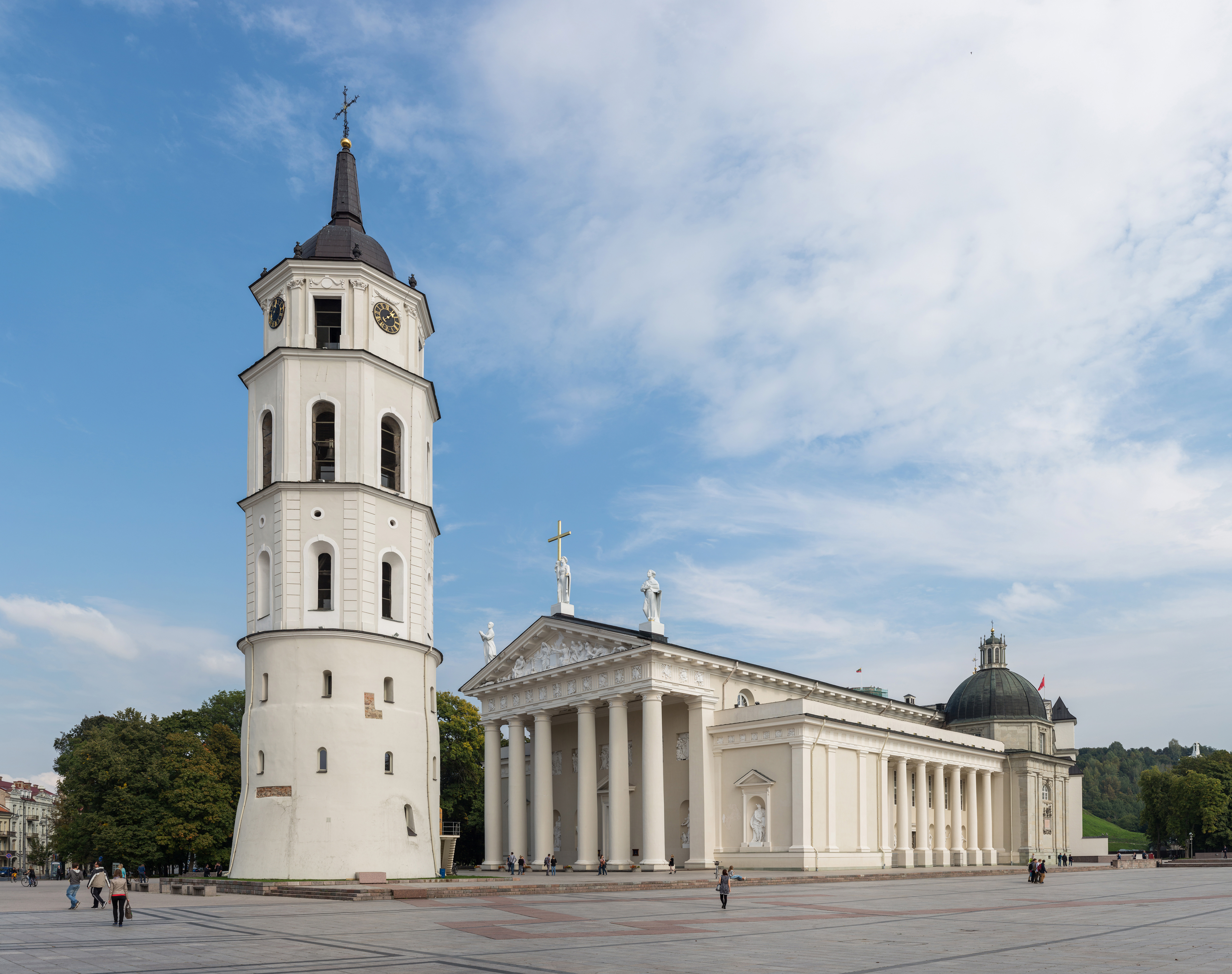
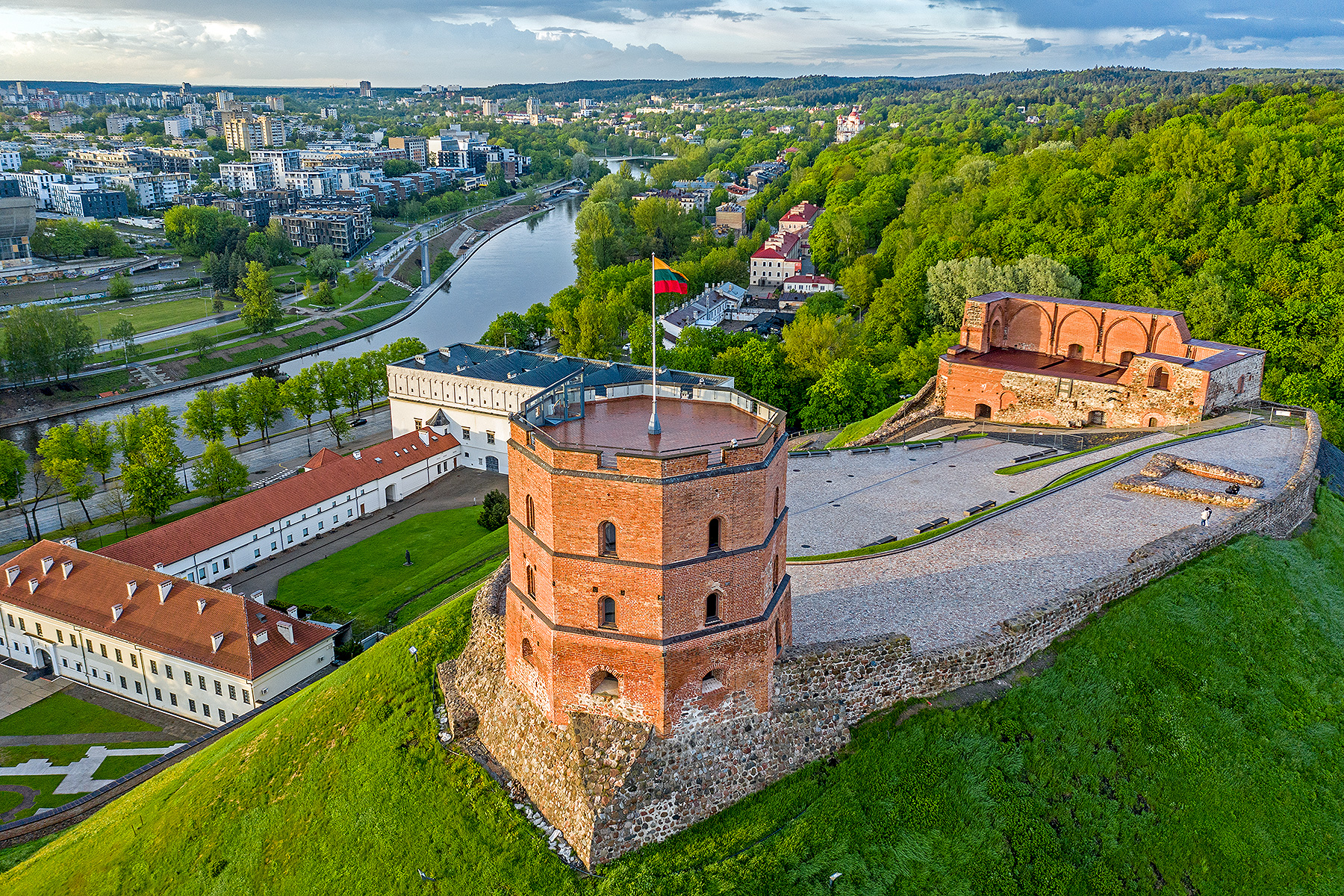
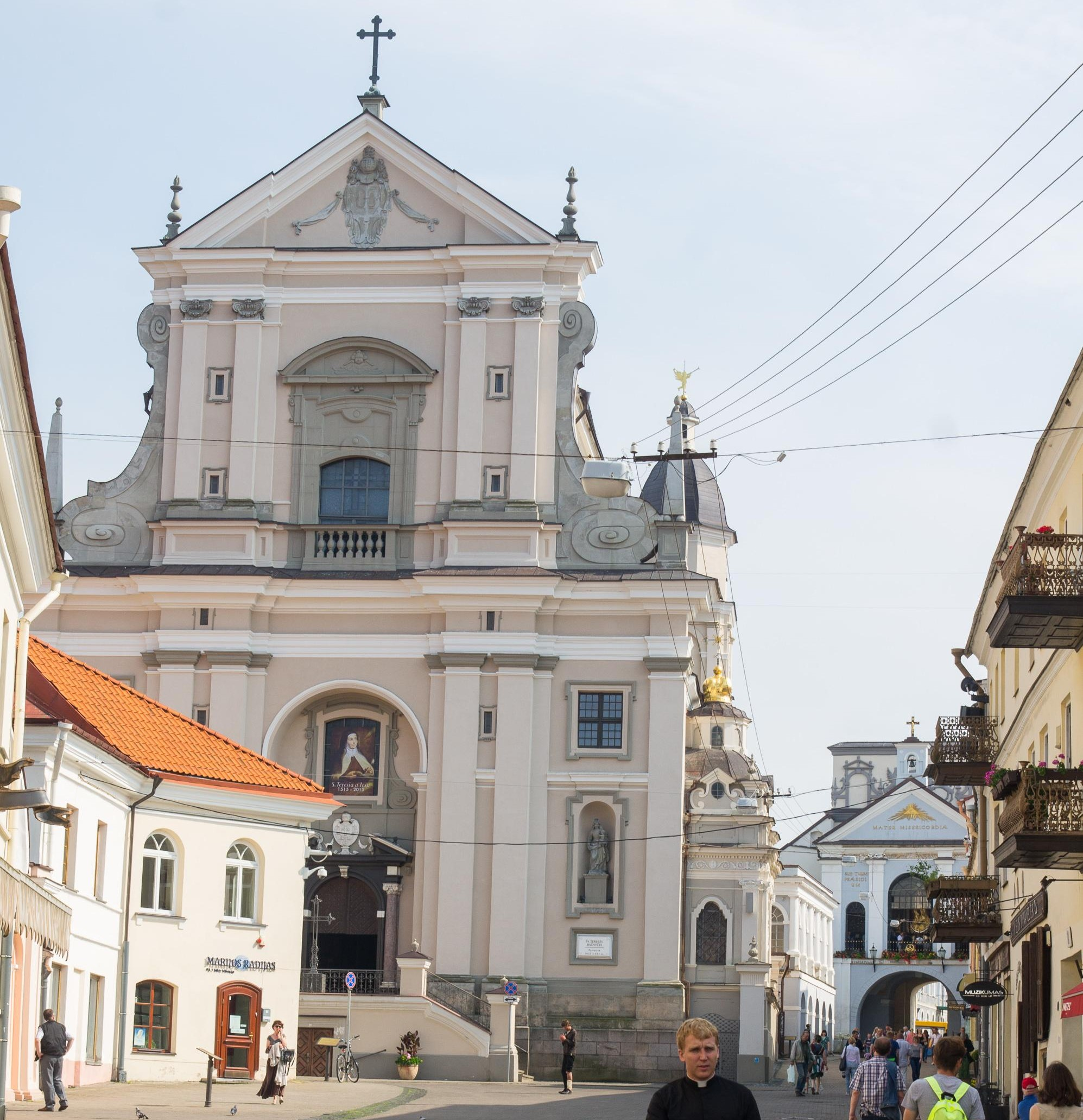
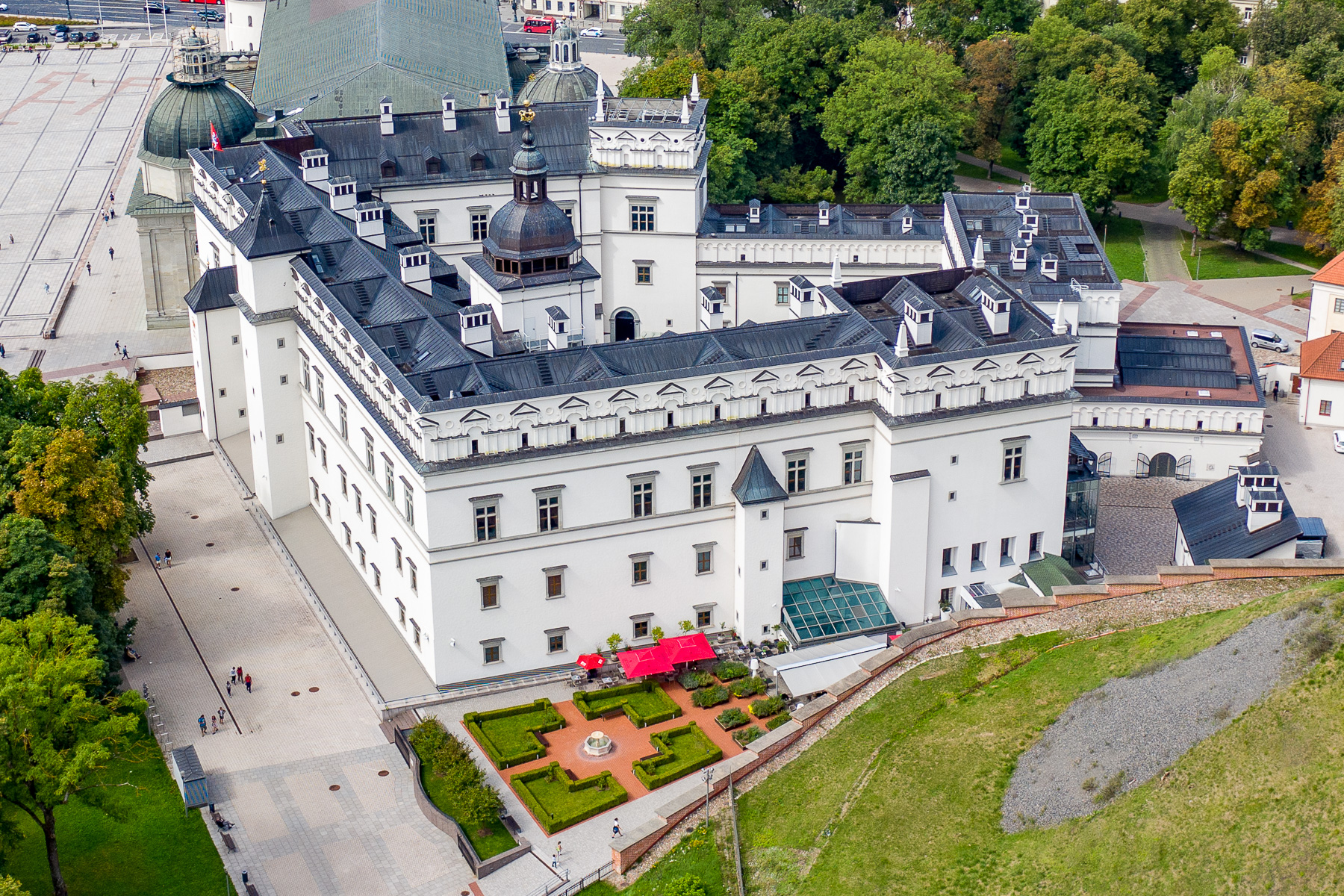
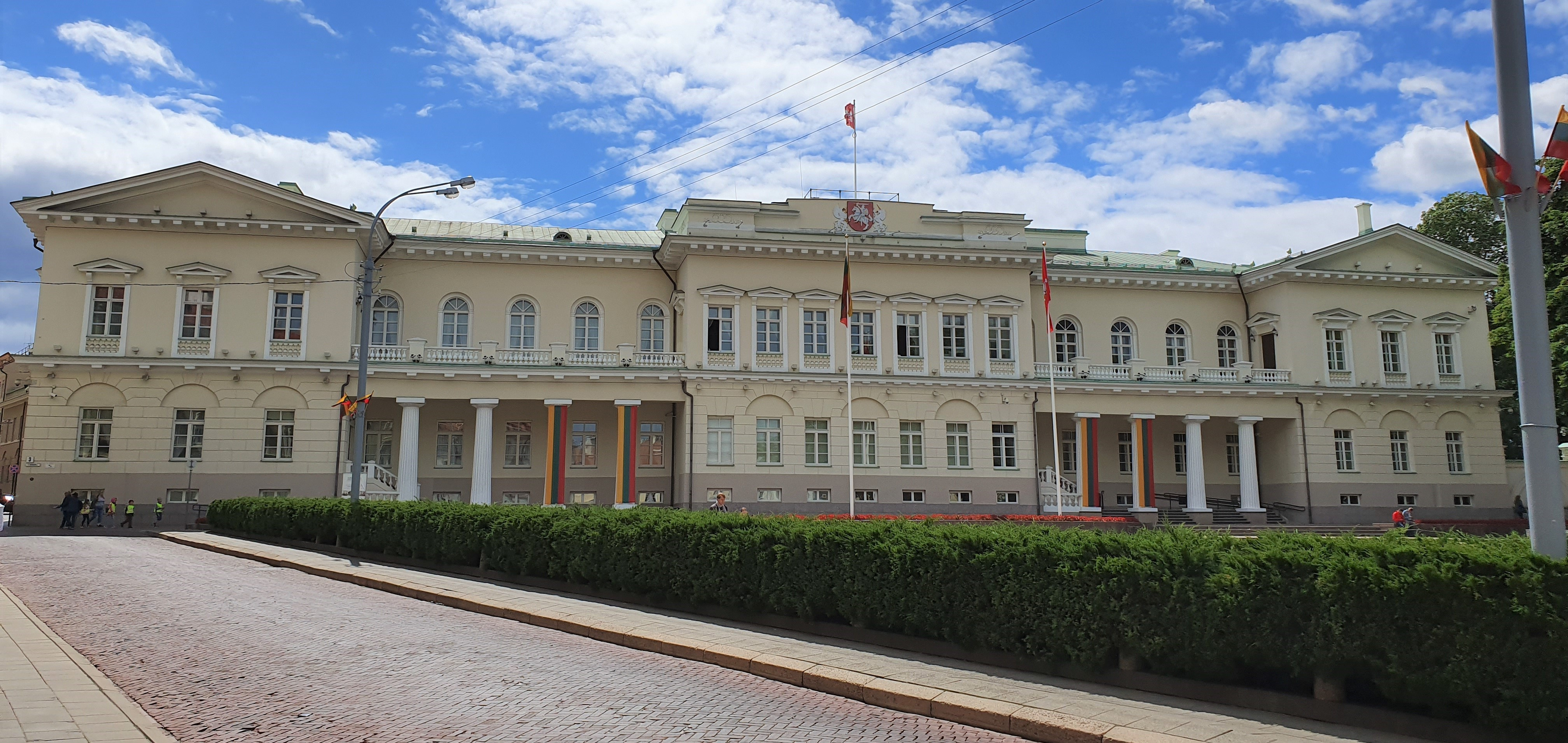
- Vilnius Old Town Vilnius Central Business District Vilnius Archcathedral Upper Castle remains with Gediminas' Tower Church of St. Theresa and Gate of Dawn Palace of the Grand Dukes of Lithuania Presidential Palace

- Flag Coat of arms Brandmark
- Nicknames: Jerusalem of the North, Rome of the North, Athens of the North, New Babylon, City of Palemon, City of Low Flying Angels, City of Mercy
- Motto: Unitas, Justitia, Spes (Latin: Unity, Justice, Hope)
- Interactive map of Vilnius
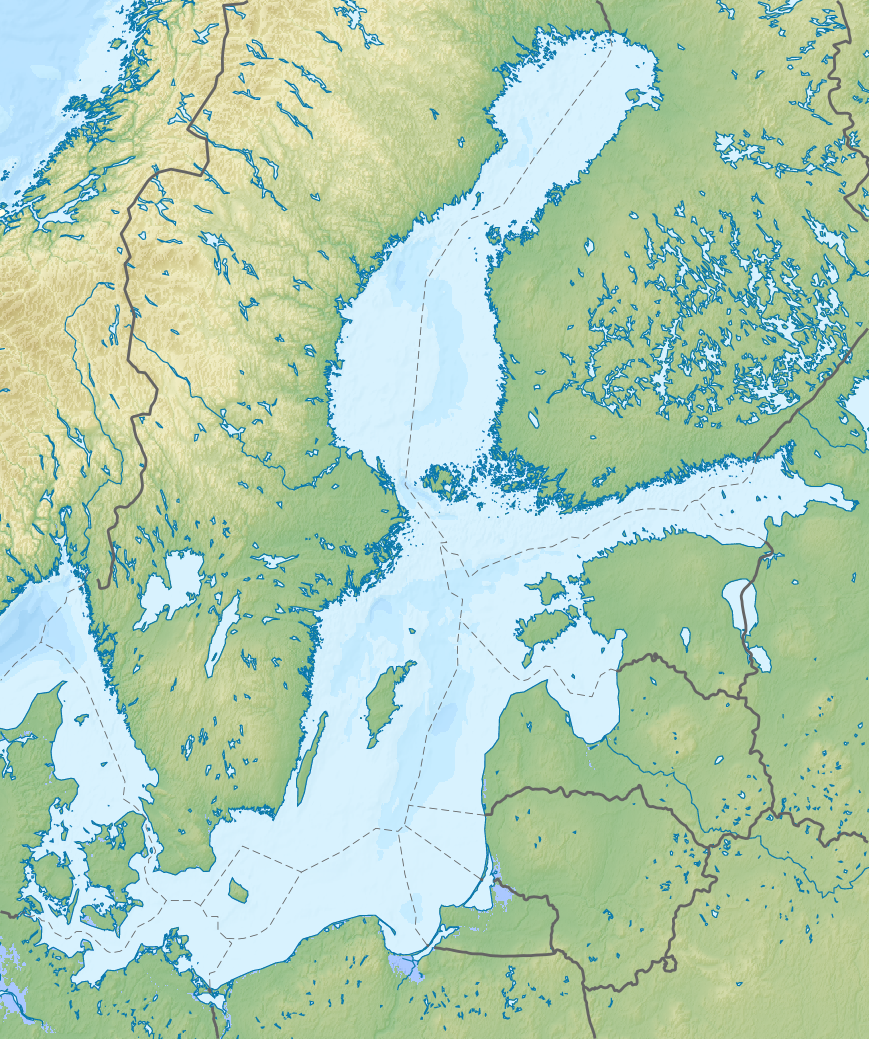
- Location within Lithuania Location within the Baltic states Location within Europe
- Coordinates: 54°41′14″N 25°16′48″E
- Country: Lithuania
- County: Vilnius County
- Municipality: Vilnius
- Capital of: Lithuania
- First mentioned: 1323
- Granted city rights: 1387
- City Hall: Vilnius City Municipality Building
- Elderships: List: Antakalnis; Fabijoniškės; Grigiškės; Justiniškės; Karoliniškės; Lazdynai; Naujamiestis; Naujininkai; Naujoji Vilnia; Paneriai; Pašilaičiai; Pilaitė; Rasos; Šeškinė; Šnipiškės; Verkiai; Vilkpėdė; Senamiestis (Old Town); Viršuliškės; Žirmūnai; Žvėrynas

Government
  - Type: Mayor–council government
  - Body: Vilnius City Municipal Council
  - Mayor: Valdas Benkunskas (TS–LKD)

Area
  - Capital city: 401 km^{2} (155 sq mi)
  - Urban: 538 km^{2} (208 sq mi)
  - Metro: 9,730 km^{2} (3,760 sq mi)
- Elevation: 112 m (367 ft)

Population (1 July 2026)
  - Capital city: 619,405
  - Rank: 1st in Lithuania; 37th in EU
  - Density: 1,515/km^{2} (3,920/sq mi)
  - Urban: 767,907
  - Urban density: 1,390/km^{2} (3,600/sq mi)
  - Metro: 888,043
  - Metro density: 90/km^{2} (230/sq mi)
- Demonym(s): Vilnian(s) (English) vilniečiai (Lithuanian)

GDP (Nominal)
  - Metro: €36.2 billion (US$40.86 billion)
  - Per capita: €41,500 (US$46,839.73)
- Time zone: UTC+02:00 (EET)
  - Summer (DST): UTC+03:00 (EEST)
- Postal code: 01001–14191
- Area code: (+370) 5
- International airport: Vilnius Čiurlionis (VNO)
- City budget: €1.7 billion (2026)
- HDI (2022): 0.918 – very high
- Climate: Dfb
- Website: vilnius.lt

UNESCO World Heritage Site
- Official name: Historic Centre of Vilnius
- Type: Cultural
- Criteria: ii, iv
- Designated: 1994 (18th session)
- Reference no.
- UNESCO region: Europe

Vilnius (/ˈvɪlniəs/ VIL-nee-əs; Lithuanian: [ˈvʲɪlʲnʲʊs]) is the capital and largest city of Lithuania and the most-populous city in the Baltic states. The city's estimated July 2026 population was 619,405, and the Vilnius urban area (which extends beyond the city limits) has an estimated population of 767,907.

Vilnius is notable for the architecture of its Old Town, considered one of Europe's largest and best-preserved old towns. The city was declared a UNESCO World Heritage Site in 1994. The architectural style known as Vilnian Baroque is named after the city, which is the easternmost Baroque city and the largest such city north of the Alps. The Renaissance and Baroque architecture of Vilnius was largely influenced by the Italian architecture as Italian descent architects, artists participated in designing and decorating it. The culture of Italy in Vilnius was significantly strengthened by the Italian princess Bona Sforza, who in 1517 married the Lithuanian Grand Duke Sigismund I the Old, and by their son Sigismund II Augustus.

The city has been the capital of Lithuania since at least 1323, when it was first mentioned as such in a letter of the Lithuanian Grand Duke Gediminas. Since the 13th century until the mid-17th century the Vilnius Castle Complex had served as the residence of the Lithuanian monarchs. Furthermore, the city was noted for its multicultural population during the Polish–Lithuanian Commonwealth, with contemporary sources comparing it to Babylon. Before World War II and the Holocaust, Vilnius was one of Europe's most important Jewish centres, leading Napoleon to dub it "the Jerusalem of the North" when he passed through in 1812. The city's current demographics are additionally marked by the population exchange between Poland and Soviet Lithuania after World War II, before which Poles made up the majority of inhabitants. As of 2021, around two thirds of Vilnius' residents were Lithuanians.

Vilnius was a 2009 European Capital of Culture with Linz in Austria. In 2021, the city was named one of fDi's 25 Global Cities of the Future. Vilnius is a financial centre, ranked 76th globally and 29th in Europe on the Global Financial Centres Index. The city is an important center for the global fintech industry. It hosted the 2023 NATO Summit. In 2025 Vilnius was the European Green Capital. Vilnius is a member of Eurocities and the Union of Capitals of the European Union (UCEU).

== Etymology and other names ==
The name of Vilnius first appeared in Latin-edited letters by Gediminas from the year 1323, in the form Vilna (in civitate nostra regia, dicta Vilna). In another letter from 1325, the form Wilno also appears (Datum Wilno). Both forms ultimately originate from the old Lithuanian name of the tributary river Vilnia (meaning ripple), which flows into the Neris River in the center of old Vilnius, near the Castle Hill. The name of the river was transferred to the city. The form Wilno is still used in the Polish language today. The Lithuanian form Vilnius, which is used today, was recorded at the turn of the 16th and 17th centuries in the Postil of Mikalojus Daukša, but it only became widespread during the Lithuanian national revival at the end of the 19th century.

The form Vilna made its way into Western European languages and, for a long time, served as the standard designation for the city of Vilnius, especially in historical and diplomatic texts. The most notable non-Lithuanian names for the city include Latin: Vilna, Polish: Wilno (Polish: [vil.nɔ]), Belarusian: Вiльня (Vilnia), German: Wilna (German: [ˈvɪlna]), Latvian: Viļņa, Ukrainian: Вільно (Vilno), Yiddish: ווילנע (Vilne), Hebrew: וילנה (Vilna). A Russian name dating to the Russian Empire was Вильна (Vilna), although Вильнюс (Vilnyus) is now used.

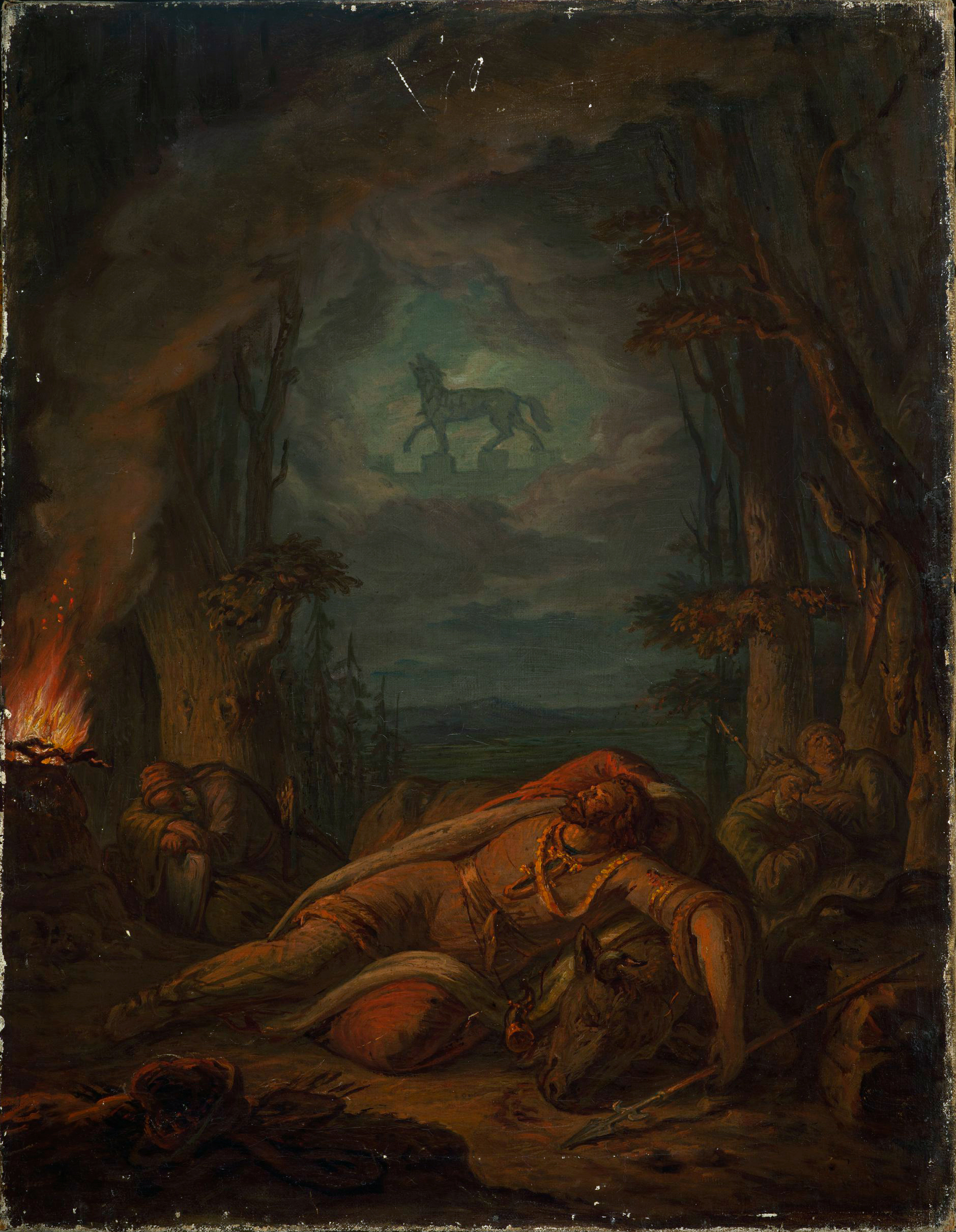
1835 painting by Aleksander Lesser of Gediminas' dream about an Iron Wolf

According to a legend recorded around the 1530s, Grand Duke Gediminas (c. 1275 – c. 1341) was hunting in the sacred forest near Šventaragis' Valley, where the Vilnia River flows into the Neris. The successful hunt for a wisent lasted longer than expected, and Gediminas decided to spend the night in the valley. That night, he dreamed of a huge Iron Wolf standing on top of a hill, howling loudly. Upon awakening, the Duke asked the krivis Lizdeika to interpret the dream. The chief priest explained:

What is destined for the ruler and the State of Lithuania, is thus: the Iron Wolf represents a castle and a city which will be established by you on this site. This city will be the capital of the Lithuanian lands and the dwelling of their rulers, and the glory of their deeds shall echo throughout the world.

Gediminas, obeying the gods, built two castles: the Lower Castle in the valley, and the Crooked Castle on Bald Hill. He moved his court there, declared it his permanent seat and capital, and developed the surrounding area into a city he named Vilnius.

== History ==
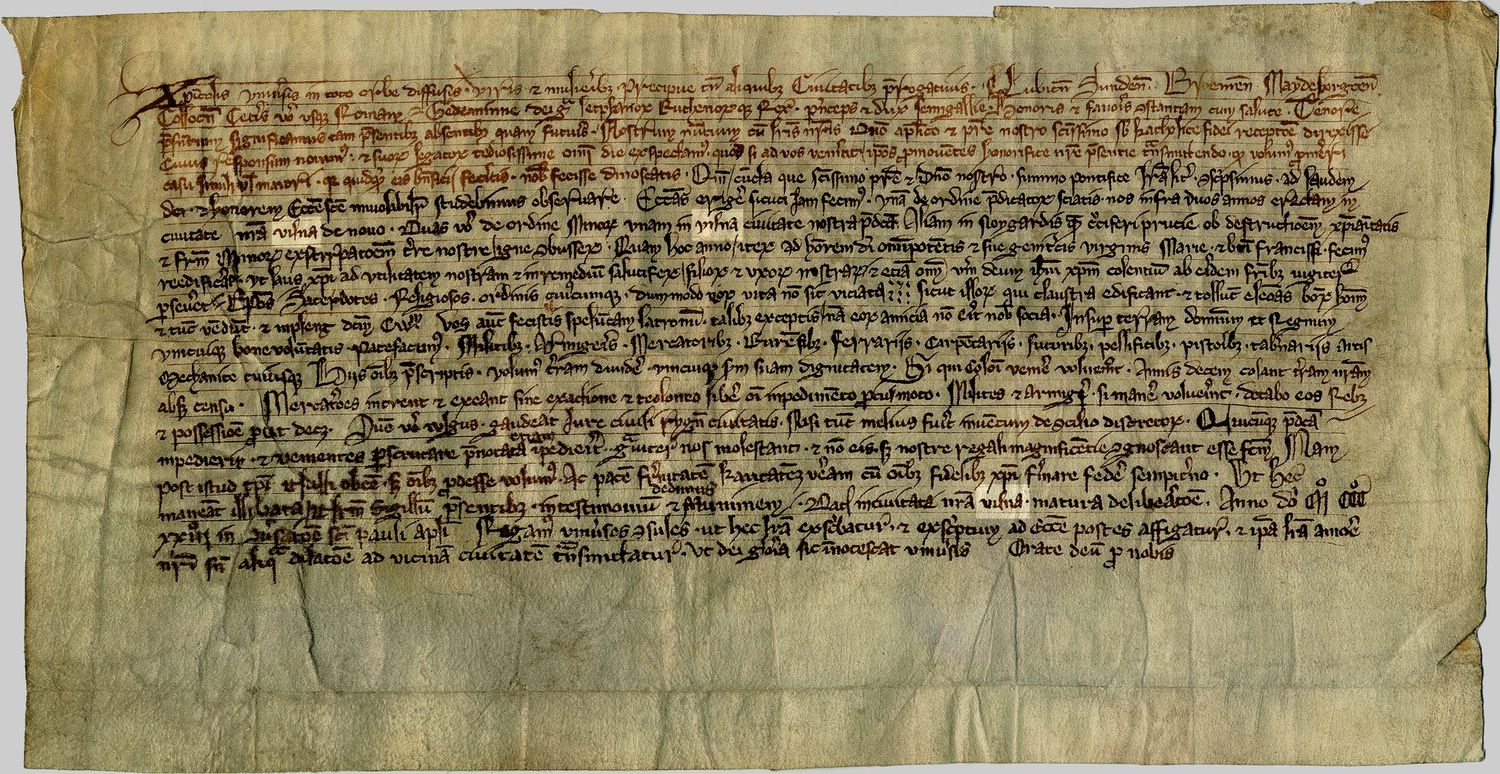
The oldest known mention of Vilnius, in Gediminas' 1323 letter

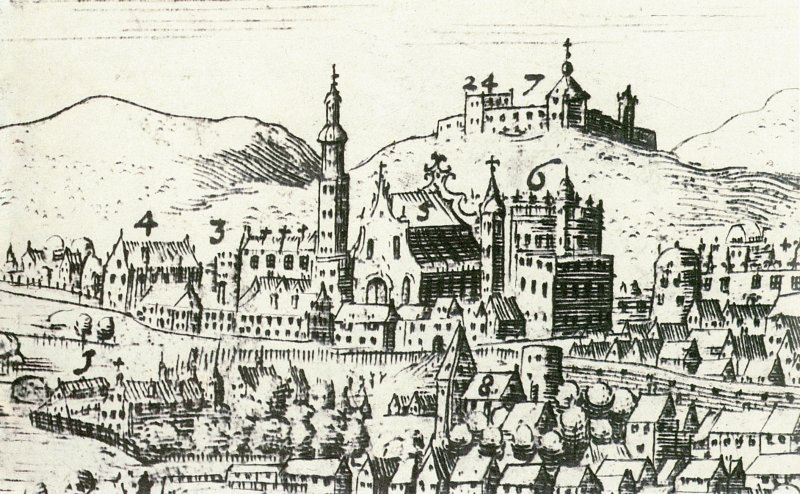
Vilnius Castle Complex in 1600 with the Upper Castle (marked as 7), Lower Castle (6), and Cathedral (5)

Vilnius's history dates to the Stone Age. The city, at least, from 1323 until 1795 was the capital of the Grand Duchy of Lithuania. Later Vilnius was ruled by imperial and Soviet Russia, Napoleonic France, Imperial and Nazi Germany, interwar Poland, and again became a capital of Lithuania in the 20th century.

A Baltic settlement since its foundation, Vilnius became significant in the Grand Duchy of Lithuania. The city was first mentioned in letters by Grand Duke Gediminas, who invited Jews and Germans to settle and built a wooden castle on a hill. Vilnius became a city when it was given city rights in 1387, after the Christianization of Lithuania, and was settled by craftsmen and merchants of a variety of nationalities. It was the capital of the Grand Duchy of Lithuania (until 1795) within the Polish–Lithuanian Commonwealth. Vilnius flourished under the Commonwealth, especially after the 1579 establishment of Vilnius University by the Lithuanian Grand Duke Stephen Báthory. The city became a cultural and scientific center, attracting migrants from east and west. It had diverse communities, with Polish, Jewish, Orthodox, and German populations. The city experienced a number of invasions and occupations, including by the Teutonic Knights, Russia and, later, Germany.

Under imperial Russian rule, Vilnius became the capital of Vilna Governorate and had a number of cultural revivals during the 19th and early 20th centuries by Jews, Poles, Lithuanians, and Belarusians. After World War I, the city experienced conflict between Poland and Lithuania which led to its occupation by Poland in October 1920. It remained part of Poland until its annexation by Lithuania in September 1939 and then by the Soviet Union in June 1940, becoming the capital of the Lithuanian Soviet Socialist Republic.

=== Independence ===
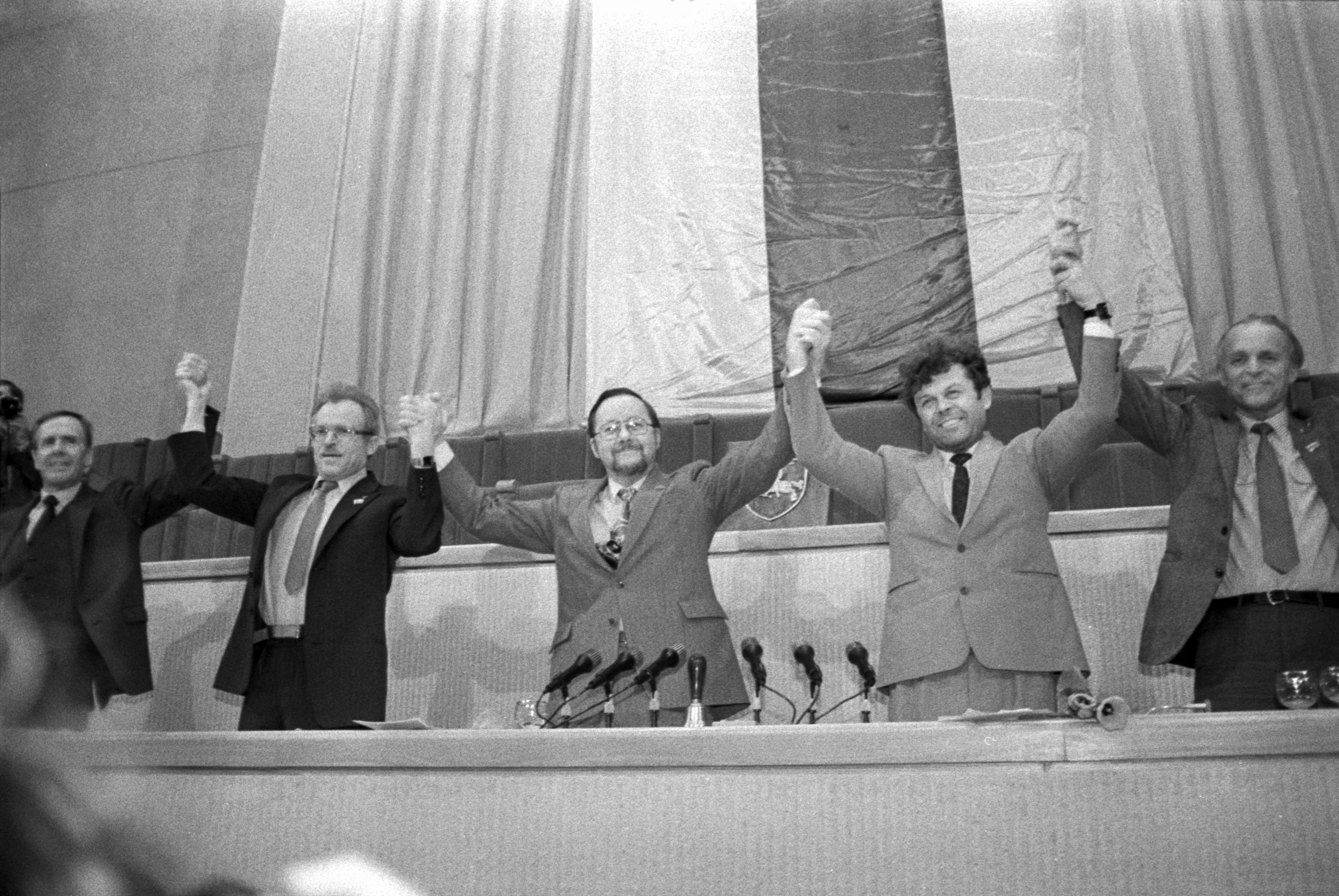
Leaders of the Supreme Council of Lithuania after adopting the Act of the Re-Establishment of the State of Lithuania on 11 March 1990 in the Seimas Palace in Vilnius

On 11 March 1990, the Supreme Council of the Lithuanian SSR announced its secession from the Soviet Union and intention to restore an independent Lithuania. On 9 January 1991, the Soviet Union sent in troops; this culminated in the 13 January attack on the State Radio and Television Building and Vilnius TV Tower which killed 14 civilians. The Soviet Union recognised Lithuanian independence in September 1991. According to the Constitution of Lithuania, "the capital of the State of Lithuania shall be the city of Vilnius, the long-standing historical capital of Lithuania".

Konstitucijos Avenue with most of the high rises constructed in the 21st century

Vilnius has become a modern European city. Its territory has been expanded with three acts since 1990, incorporating urban areas, villages, hamlets, and the city of Grigiškės. Most historic buildings have been renovated and a business and commercial area became the New City Centre, the main administrative and business district on the north side of the river Neris. The area includes modern residential and retail space, with the municipal building and the 148.3 m (487 ft) Europa Tower its most prominent buildings.

Vilnius was selected as a 2009 European Capital of Culture with Linz, the capital of Upper Austria. The 2008 financial crisis led to a drop in tourism, which prevented many projects from completion; allegations of corruption and incompetence were made; tax increases for cultural activity led to protests, and economic conditions sparked riots. On 28–29 November 2013, Vilnius hosted the Eastern Partnership summit at the Palace of the Grand Dukes of Lithuania. Many European presidents, prime ministers, and high-ranking officials participated. In 2015, Remigijus Šimašius became the city's first directly elected mayor. The 2023 NATO summit was held in Vilnius.

== Geography ==
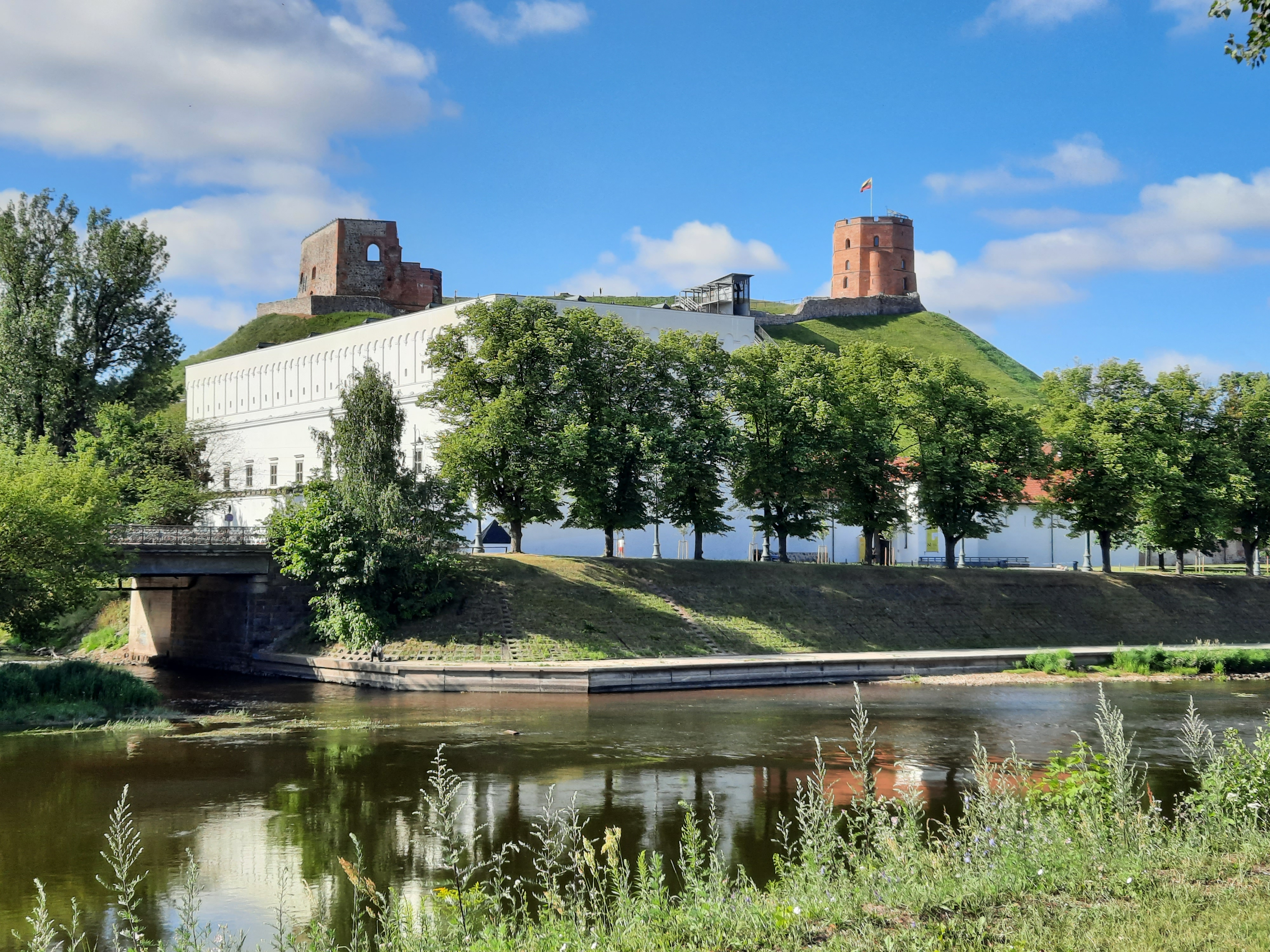
Rivers Vilnia and Neris confluence

Vilnius is at the confluence of the Vilnia and Neris rivers in southeastern Lithuania. Vilnius is 312 km (194 mi) from the Baltic Sea and Klaipėda, the main Lithuanian seaport. It is connected by road to other major Lithuanian cities, such as Kaunas (102 km or 63 mi away), Šiauliai (214 km or 133 mi away) and Panevėžys (135 km or 84 mi away).

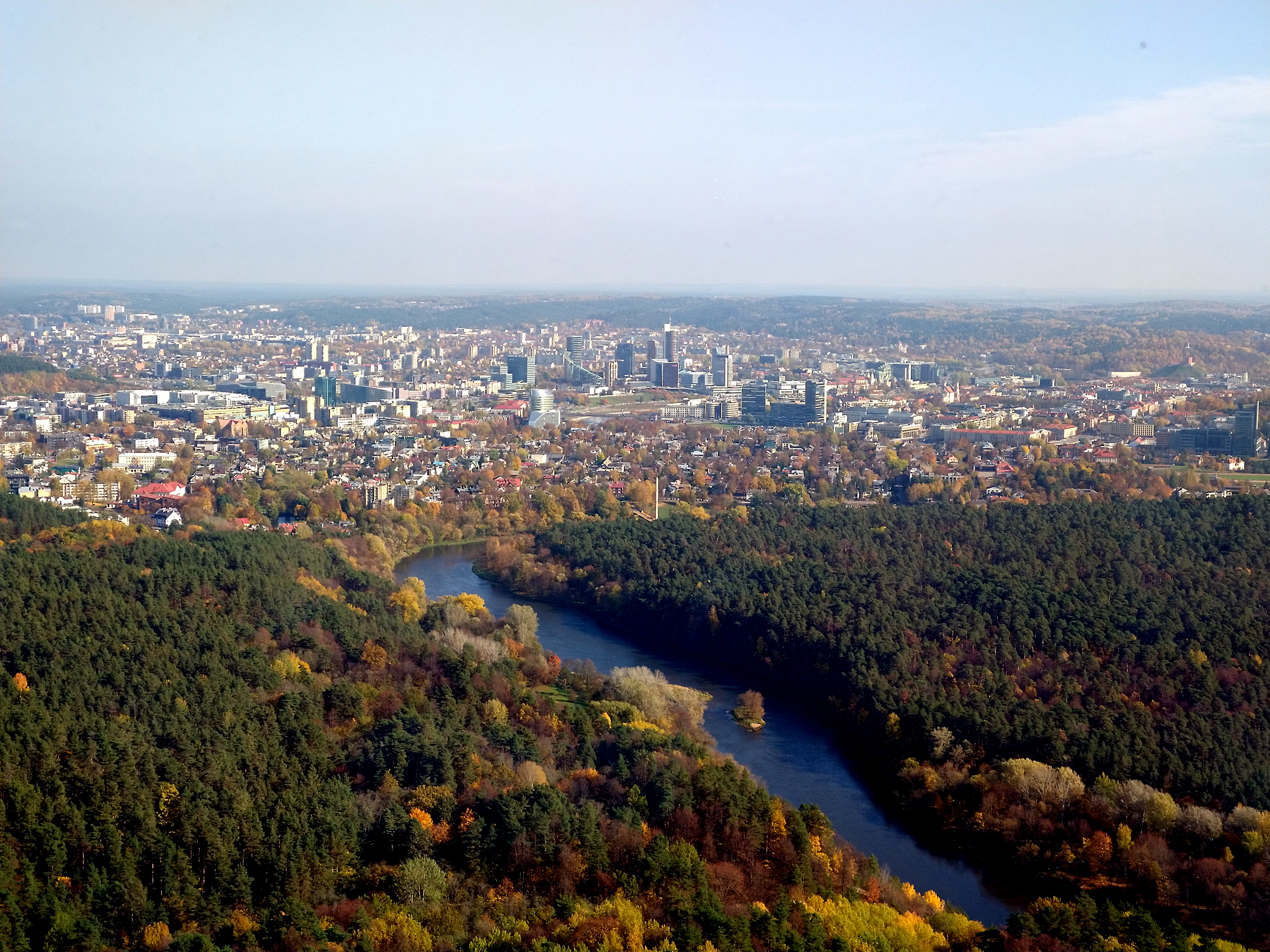
Aerial view of Vilnius City Centre and its surrounding green space

Vilnius has an area of 402 km^{2} (155 sq mi). Buildings cover 29.1 percent of the city; green space covers 68.8 percent, and water covers 2.1 percent. The city has eight nature reserves: Vokės Senslėnio Slopes Geomorphological Reserve, Aukštagiris Geomorphological Reserve, Valakupių Klonio Geomorphological Reserve, Veržuva Hydrographic Reserve, Vokė Hydrographic Reserve, Cedronas Upstream Landscape Reserve, Tapeliai Landscape Reserve, and Šeškinė Slopes Geomorphological Reserve.

Several lakes, including Balžis, are located on the north-eastern outskirts of Vilnius.

One of the claimed locations for the geographical midpoint of Europe is located in the vicinity of Vilnius, 26 kilometers from the city. The claim is based on the 1989 work by Jean-George Affholder of the Institut Géographique National (French National Geographic Institute) who used the centre of gravity of the geometrical figure of Europe to estimate the midpoint at 54°54′N 25°19′E, near the village of Girija. A monument by sculptor Gediminas Jokūbonis, a column of white granite surmounted by a crown of stars, was built there in 2004.

== Climate ==
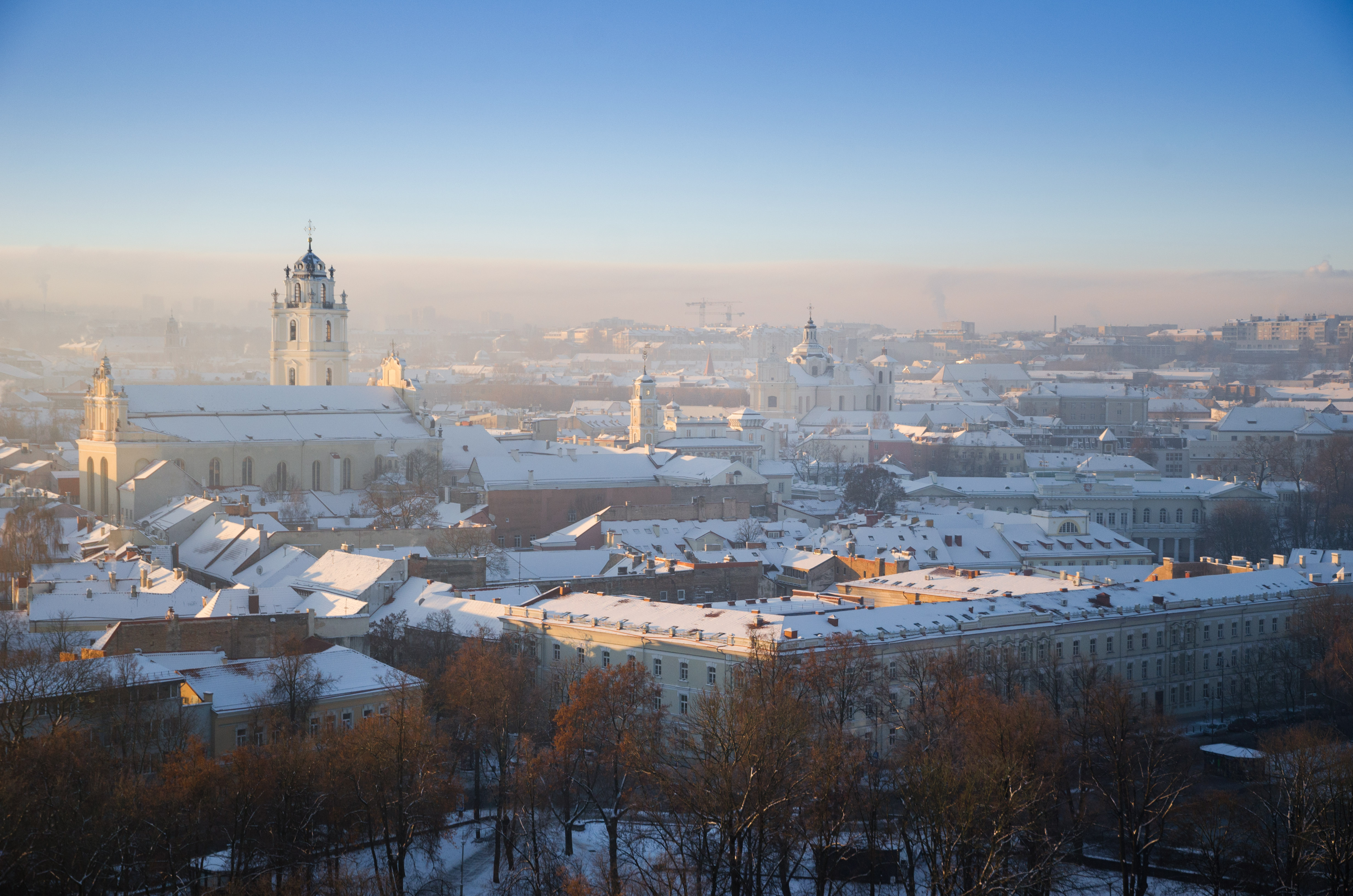
A foggy winter sunrise

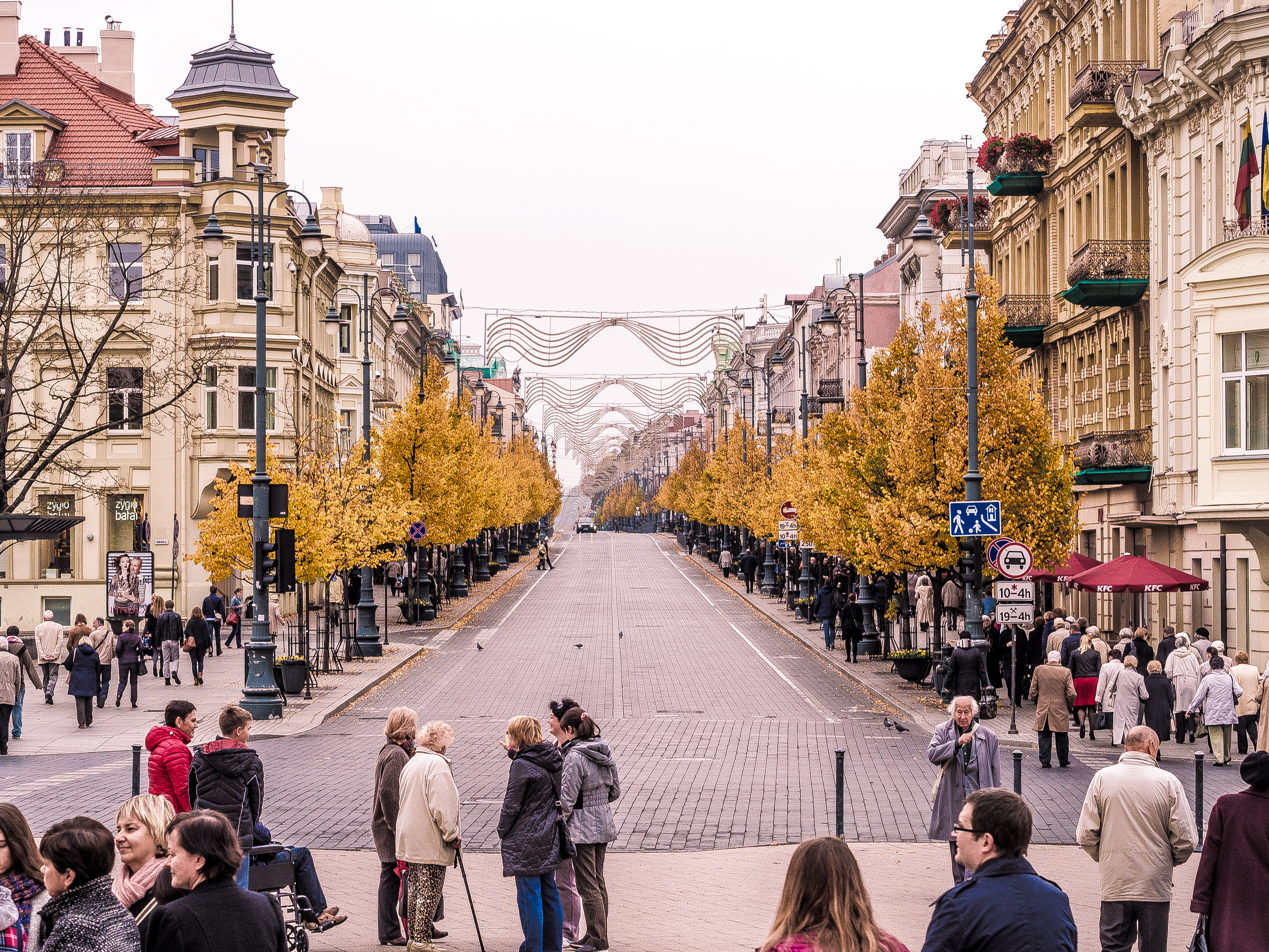
Gediminas Avenue in autumn

Vilnius has a humid continental climate (Köppen climate classification Dfb), with temperature records since 1777. The average annual temperature is 7.3 °C (45 °F); the average January temperature is −3.9 °C (25 °F), and the July average is 18.7 °C (66 °F). Average annual precipitation is 691 mm (27.20 in). Temperatures in the city have increased significantly during the last 30 years, a change which the Lithuanian Hydrometeorological Service attributes to human-induced global warming.

Summer days are warm to hot, especially in July and August, with daytime temperatures above 30 °C (86 °F) during periodic heat waves. Outdoor bars, restaurants and cafés are frequented during the day.

Winters can be very cold, although temperatures above 0 °C (32 °F); still occasionally occur. Temperatures below −25 °C (−13 °F) are recorded every other year. Vilnius's rivers freeze in particularly cold winters, and the lakes surrounding the city are almost always frozen from December to March, and even April, in the most extreme years. The Lithuanian Hydrometeorological Service, headquartered in Vilnius, monitors the country's climate.

Climate data for Vilnius (1991–2020 normals, extremes 1777–present)
Month	Jan	Feb	Mar	Apr	May	Jun	Jul	Aug	Sep	Oct	Nov	Dec	Year
Record high °C (°F)	12.3 (54.1)	14.4 (57.9)	24.7 (76.5)	29.0 (84.2)	31.8 (89.2)	34.2 (93.6)	36.4 (97.5)	34.9 (94.8)	33.1 (91.6)	24.5 (76.1)	15.5 (59.9)	10.5 (50.9)	36.4 (97.5)
Mean maximum °C (°F)	4.9 (40.8)	5.7 (42.3)	13.1 (55.6)	22.4 (72.3)	26.7 (80.1)	28.8 (83.8)	30.8 (87.4)	30.3 (86.5)	25.4 (77.7)	18.3 (64.9)	11.1 (52.0)	6.1 (43.0)	32.1 (89.8)
Mean daily maximum °C (°F)	−1.5 (29.3)	−0.4 (31.3)	4.5 (40.1)	12.7 (54.9)	18.5 (65.3)	21.8 (71.2)	23.8 (74.8)	23.1 (73.6)	17.4 (63.3)	10.3 (50.5)	3.9 (39.0)	−0.1 (31.8)	11.2 (52.2)
Daily mean °C (°F)	−3.7 (25.3)	−3.1 (26.4)	0.7 (33.3)	7.4 (45.3)	12.9 (55.2)	16.3 (61.3)	18.5 (65.3)	17.6 (63.7)	12.6 (54.7)	6.8 (44.2)	1.9 (35.4)	−2 (28)	7.2 (45.0)
Mean daily minimum °C (°F)	−6 (21)	−5.6 (21.9)	−2.7 (27.1)	2.6 (36.7)	7.5 (45.5)	11.2 (52.2)	13.6 (56.5)	12.7 (54.9)	8.5 (47.3)	3.8 (38.8)	−0.1 (31.8)	−4.1 (24.6)	3.5 (38.3)
Mean minimum °C (°F)	−19.3 (−2.7)	−17.5 (0.5)	−10.8 (12.6)	−4.2 (24.4)	0.1 (32.2)	4.9 (40.8)	8.1 (46.6)	6.8 (44.2)	1.1 (34.0)	−3.8 (25.2)	−8.7 (16.3)	−14.1 (6.6)	−22.0 (−7.6)
Record low °C (°F)	−37.2 (−35.0)	−35.8 (−32.4)	−29.6 (−21.3)	−14.4 (6.1)	−4.4 (24.1)	0.1 (32.2)	3.5 (38.3)	1.0 (33.8)	−4.8 (23.4)	−14.4 (6.1)	−22.8 (−9.0)	−30.5 (−22.9)	−37.2 (−35.0)
Average precipitation mm (inches)	48 (1.9)	42 (1.7)	41 (1.6)	43 (1.7)	56 (2.2)	65 (2.6)	92 (3.6)	76 (3.0)	57 (2.2)	60 (2.4)	47 (1.9)	51 (2.0)	678 (26.7)
Average precipitation days	21.7	18.4	17.5	10.2	12.4	11.7	11.4	10.5	9.7	13.5	16.7	21.2	174.9
Average relative humidity (%)	88	85	76	67	67	70	73	73	79	85	90	90	79
Average dew point °C (°F)	−5 (23)	−5 (23)	−3 (27)	1 (34)	6 (43)	10 (50)	13 (55)	12 (54)	9 (48)	4 (39)	0 (32)	−3 (27)	3 (38)
Mean monthly sunshine hours	35.1	56.4	131.9	194.6	260.7	263.3	262.9	245.7	168.1	95.1	31.0	24.6	1,769.4
Average ultraviolet index	0	1	2	3	5	6	6	5	3	2	1	0	3
Source 1: Lithuanian Hydrometeorological Service, WMO (avg high and low), NOAA (extremes)
Source 2: Météo Climat (precipitation days), Time and Date (dewpoints, 1985–2015) and Weather Atlas

== Culture ==
=== Painting and sculpture ===
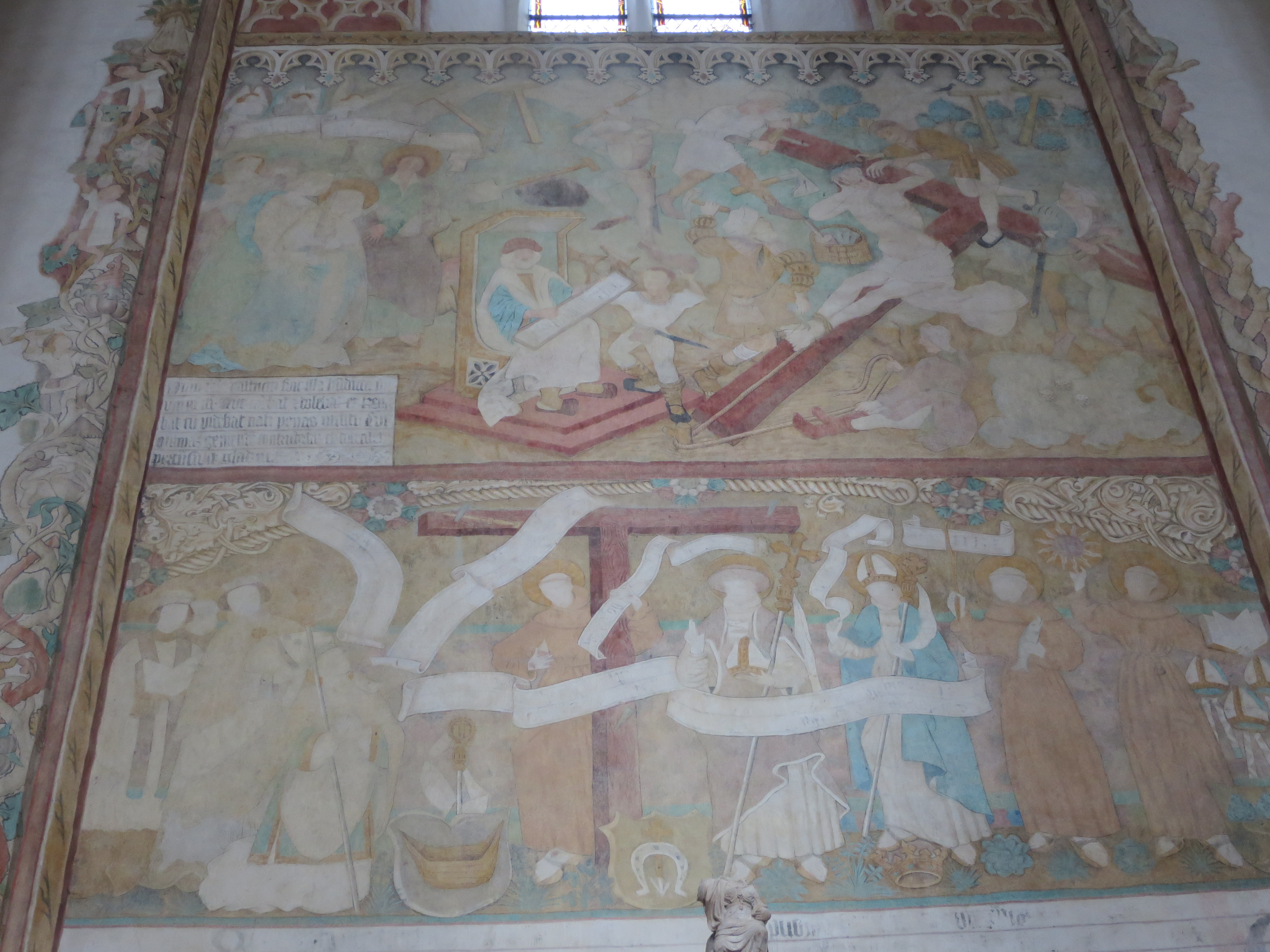
16th-century Gothic frescoes in the Church of St. Francis and St. Bernard

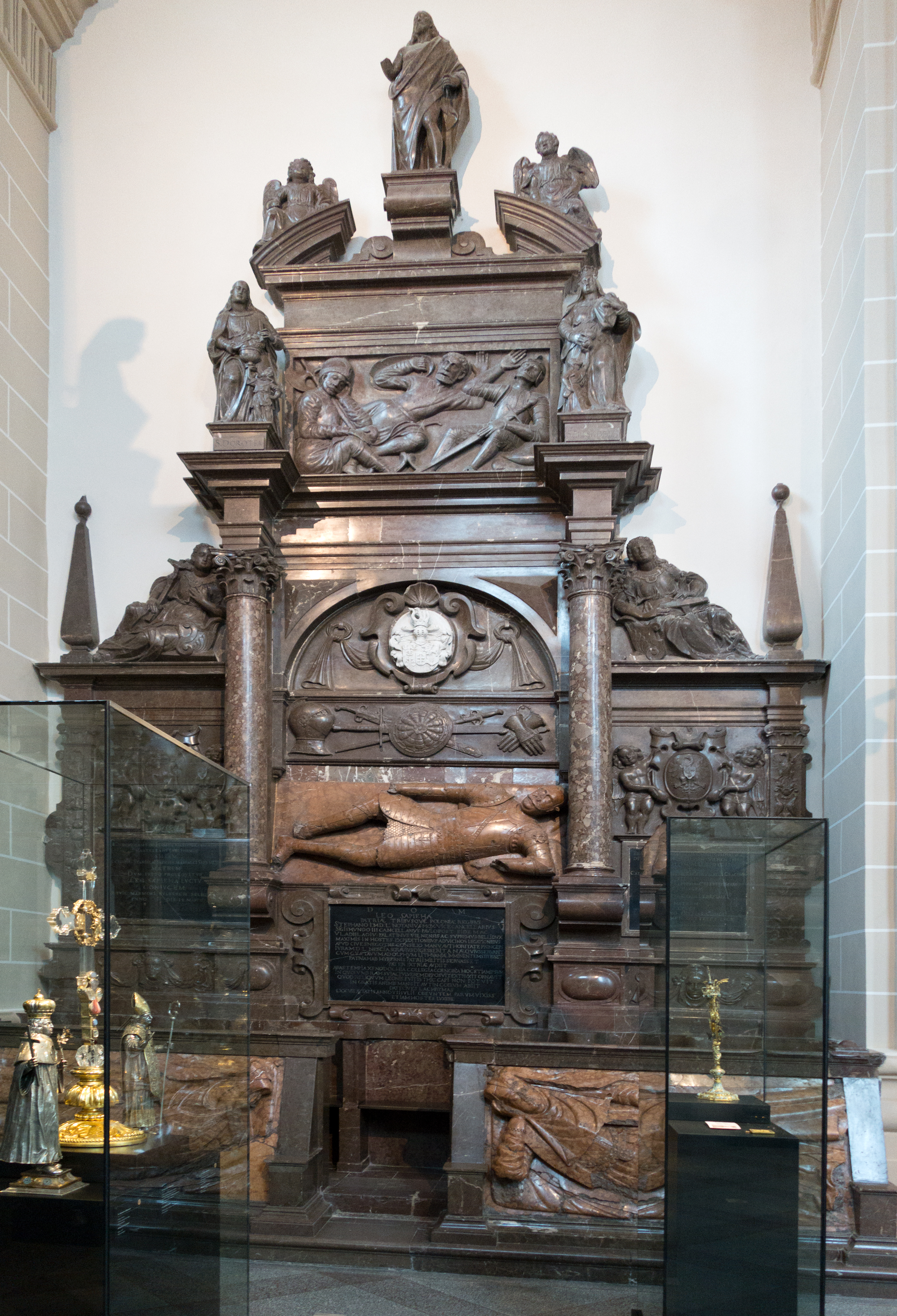
Tombstone of Lew Sapieha, c. 1633, in the Church of St. Michael

Vilnius was an artistic centre of the Grand Duchy of Lithuania, attracting artists across Europe. The oldest surviving early Gothic artworks (14th century) are paintings dedicated to churches and liturgy, such as frescoes in the crypts of Vilnius Cathedral and decorated hymnbooks. Sixteenth-century wall paintings are in the city's Church of St. Francis and St. Bernard and the Church of Saint Nicholas. Gothic wooden polychrome sculptures decorate church altars. Some Gothic seals from the 14th and 15th centuries still exist, including those of Kęstutis, Vytautas the Great and Sigismund II Augustus.

Renaissance sculpture appeared during the early 16th century, primarily by the Italian sculptors Bernardinus Zanobi da Gianotti, Giovani Cini, and Giovanni Maria Padovano. During the Renaissance, portrait tombstones and medals were valued; examples are the marble tombs of Albertas Goštautas (1548) and Paweł Holszański (1555) by Bernardino de Gianotis in Vilnius Cathedral. Italian sculpture is characterized by its naturalistic treatment of forms and precise proportions. Local sculptors adopted the iconographic scheme of Renaissance tombs; their works, such the tomb of Lew Sapieha (c. 1633) in the Church of St. Michael, are stylized. During this period, local and Western European painters created religious and mythological compositions and portraits with late Gothic and Baroque features; illustrated prayerbooks, illustrations, and miniatures have survived.

During the late-16th-century Baroque, wall painting had developed. Most palaces and churches were decorated in frescoes with bright colors, sophisticated angles, and drama. Secular painting – representational, imaginative, epitaph portraits, scenes of battles and politically important events in a detailed, realistic style – also spread at this time. Baroque sculptures dominated sacred architecture: tombstones with sculpted portraits and decorative sculptures in wood, marble, and stucco. Italian sculptors such as G. P. Perti, G. M. Galli, and A. S. Capone, key figures in the development of sculpture in the 17th-century grand duchy, were commissioned by Lithuanian nobility. Their works exemplify the mature Baroque, with expressive forms and sensuality. Local sculptors emphasized Baroque decorative features, with less expression and emotion.

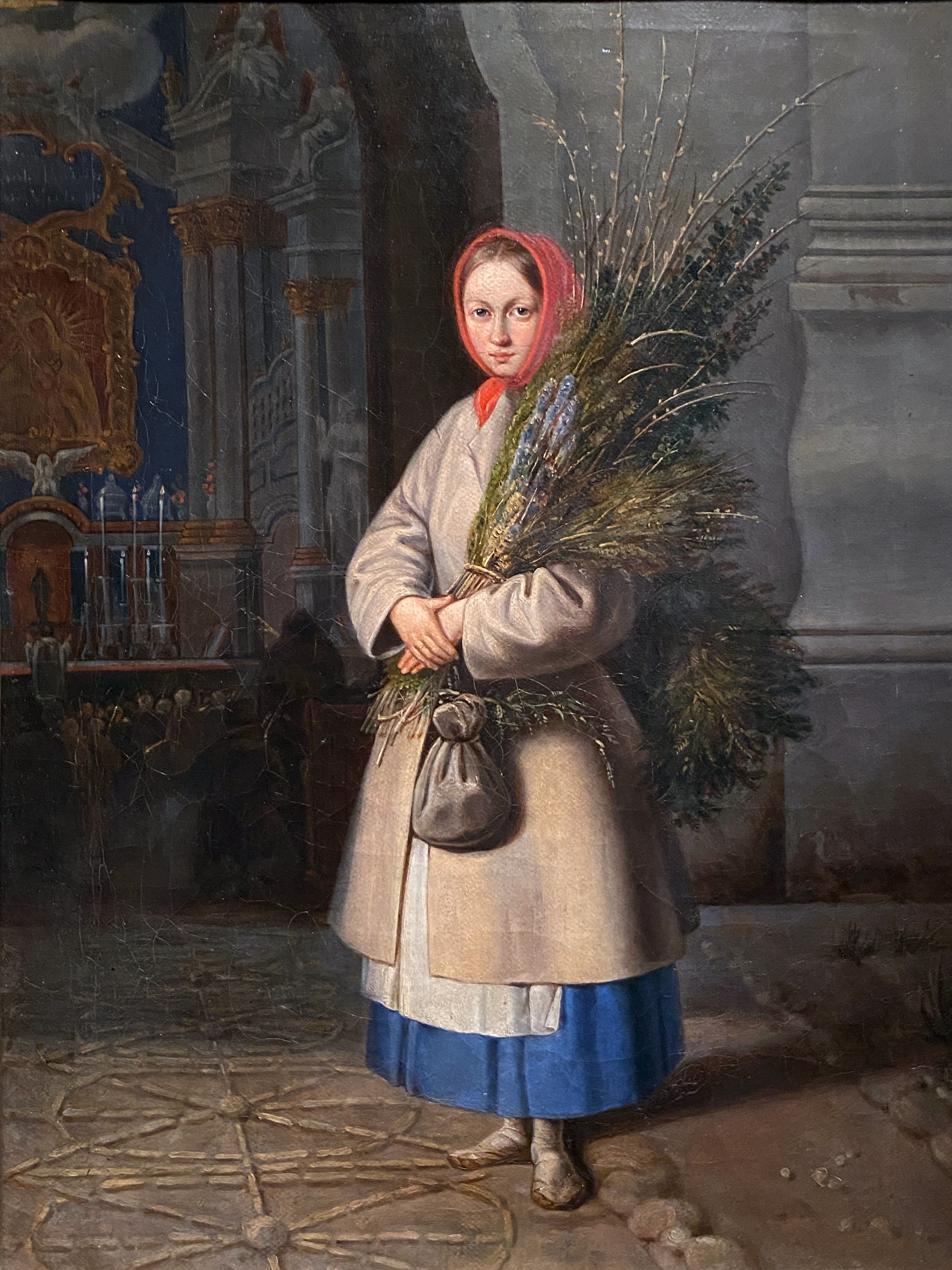
Lithuanian Girl with Palm Sunday Fronds by Kanuty Rusiecki

Lithuanian painting was influenced by the Vilnius Art School during the late 18th and 19th centuries, which introduced classical and romantic art. Painters had internships abroad, mainly in Italy. Allegorical, mythological compositions, landscapes, and portraits of representatives of various circles of society began, and historical themes prevailed. The era's best-known classical painters are Franciszek Smaglewicz, Jan Rustem, Józef Oleszkiew, Daniel Kondratowicz, Józef Peszka, and Wincenty Smokowski. Romantic artists were Jan Rustem, Jan Krzysztof Damel, Wincenty Dmochowski and Kanuty Rusiecki. After the 1832 closure of Vilnius University, the Vilnius Art School continued to influence Lithuanian art.

The Lithuanian Art Society was established in 1907 by Petras Rimša, Antanas Žmuidzinavičius and Antanas Jaroševičius, and the Vilnius Art Society was founded the following year. Artists included Jonas Šileika, Justinas Vienožinskis, Jonas Mackevičius (1872), Vytautas Kairiūkštis, and Vytautas Pranas Bičiūnas, who employed Western European symbolism, realism, Art Nouveau and modernism. Socialist realism was introduced after World War II, with propaganda paintings, historical and household works, still lives, landscapes, portraits, and sculptures. Notable late 20th and 21st century painters include Žygimantas Augustinas, Eglė Ridikaitė, Eglė Gineitytė, Patricija Jurkšaitytė, Jurga Barilaitė, and Solomonas Teitelbaumas.

The Užupis district near the Old Town, a run-down district during the Soviet era, hosts bohemian artists who operate a number of art galleries and workshops. In its main square, a statue of an angel blowing a trumpet symbolises artistic freedom.

The world's first bronze memorial to Frank Zappa was installed in the Naujamiestis district in 1995. In 2015, the Vilnius Talking Statues project was introduced. Eighteen statues around the city interact by smartphone with visitors in several languages.

=== Museums and galleries ===
Vilnius has a variety of museums. The National Museum of Lithuania, in the Palace of the Grand Dukes of Lithuania, Gediminas' Tower and the arsenals of the Vilnius Castle Complex, has exhibits about the history of Lithuania and Lithuanian culture. The Museum of Applied Arts and Design displays Lithuanian folk and religious art, objects from the Palace of the Grand Dukes of Lithuania, and 18th- to 20th-century clothing. Other museums are the Vilnius Museum, the House of Histories, Church Heritage Museum, Museum of Occupations and Freedom Fights, Fight for Freedom Museum in the Vilnius TV Tower, M. K. Čiurlionis House, Samuel Bak Museum, Centre for Civil Education, Toy Museum, Vilnil (Museum of Illusions), Energy and Technology Museum, House of Signatories, Tolerance Center, Railway Museum, Money Museum, Kazys Varnelis House-Museum, Liubavas Manor Watermill-Museum, Museum of Vladislovas Sirokomlė, Amber Museum-Gallery, and the Paneriai Memorial visitor information centre.

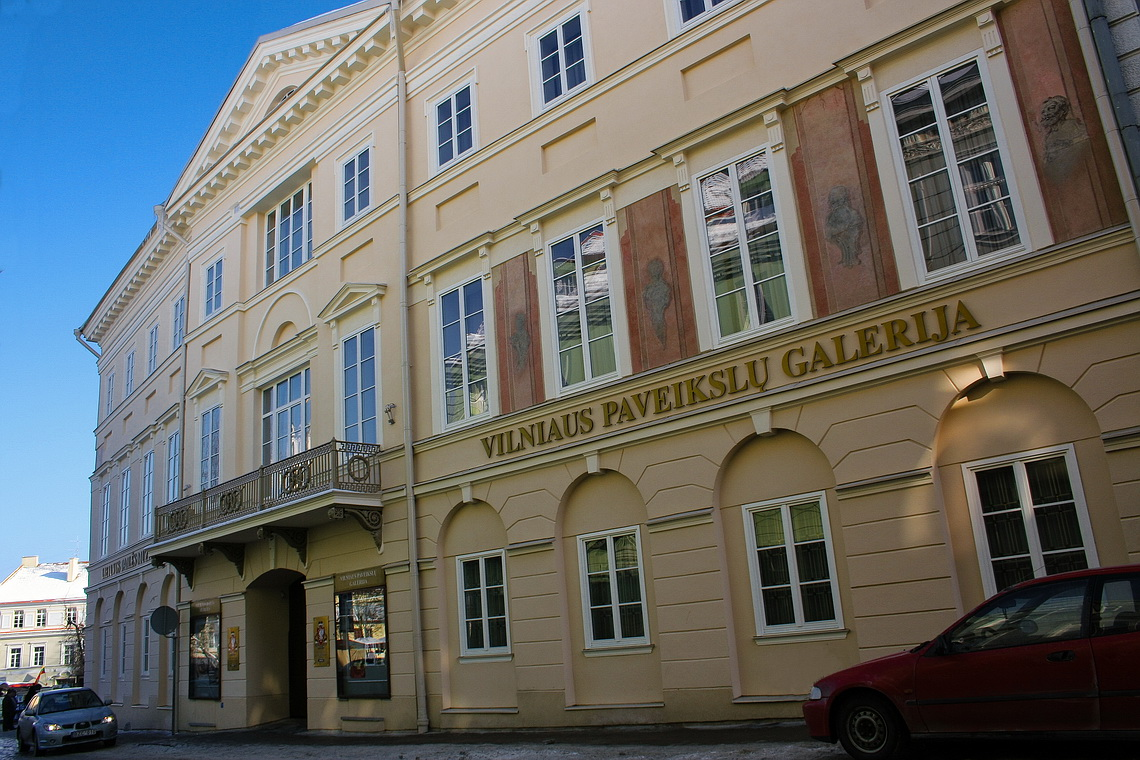
The Lithuanian National Museum of Art, in the former Chodkiewicz Palace

Vilnius has a number of art galleries. Lithuania's largest art collection is housed in the Lithuanian National Museum of Art. The Vilnius Picture Gallery, in the city's Old Town, houses a collection of Lithuanian art from the 16th to the early 20th centuries. Across the Neris, the National Art Gallery has a number of exhibitions of 20th-century Lithuanian art. The Contemporary Art Centre, the largest contemporary-art venue in the Baltic States, has an exhibition space of 2,400 square metres (26,000 sq ft). The centre develops international and Lithuanian exhibitions and presents a range of public programs which include lectures, seminars, performances, film and video screenings, and live music. On 10 November 2007, the Jonas Mekas Visual Arts Center was opened by avant-garde filmmaker Jonas Mekas; its premiere exhibition was The Avant-Garde: From Futurism to Fluxus. In 2018, the MO Museum opened as an initiative of Lithuanian scientists and philanthropists Danguolė and Viktoras Butkus. Its collection of 5,000 modern pieces includes major Lithuanian artworks from the 1950s to the present.

=== Literature ===
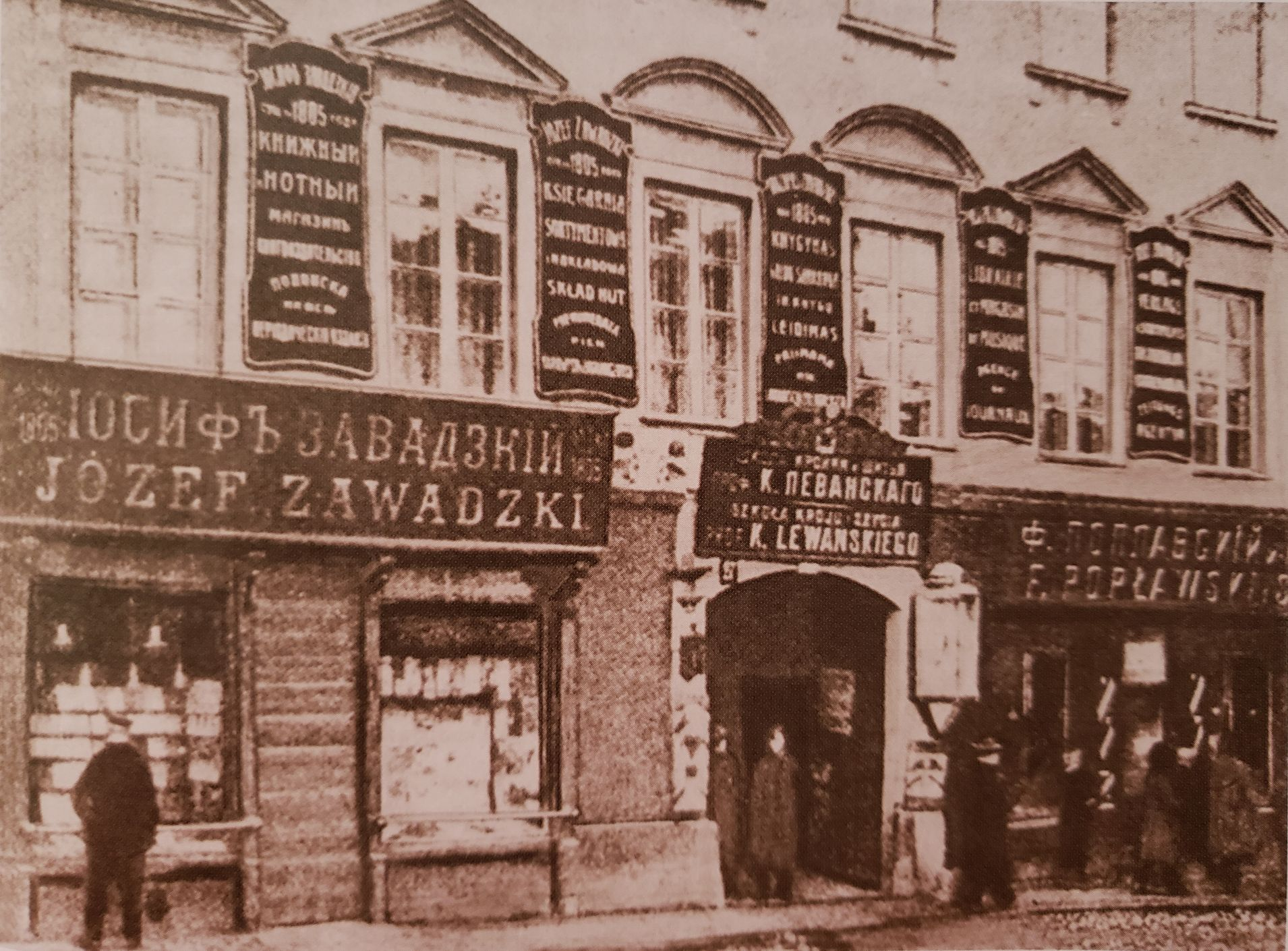
The Zawadzki bookstore, on present-day Pilies Street. Its signs are in Russian, Polish, Lithuanian, French, and German.

Around 1520, Francysk Skaryna (author of the first Ruthenian Bible) established eastern Europe's first printing house in Vilnius. Skaryna prepared and published the Little Traveller's Book (Ruthenian: Малая подорожная книжка), the first printed book of the Grand Duchy of Lithuania, in 1522. Three years later, he printed the Acts and Epistles of the Apostles (the Apostle).

The Vilnius Academy Press was established in 1575 by Lithuanian nobleman Mikołaj Krzysztof "the Orphan" Radziwiłł as the Vilnius Academy printing house, delegating its management to the Jesuits. It published its first book, Piotr Skarga's Pro Sacratissima Eucharistia contra haeresim Zwinglianam, in May 1576. The press was funded by the Lithuanian nobility and the church. In 1805, Józef Zawadzki bought the press and founded the Józef Zawadzki printing shop. Operating continuously until 1939, it published books in a number of languages; Adam Mickiewicz's first poetry book was published in 1822.

Mikalojus Daukša translated and published a catechism by Spanish Jesuit theologian Jacobo Ledesma in 1595, the first printed Lithuanian-language book in the Grand Duchy of Lithuania. He also translated and published Jakub Wujek's Postilla Catholica in 1599.

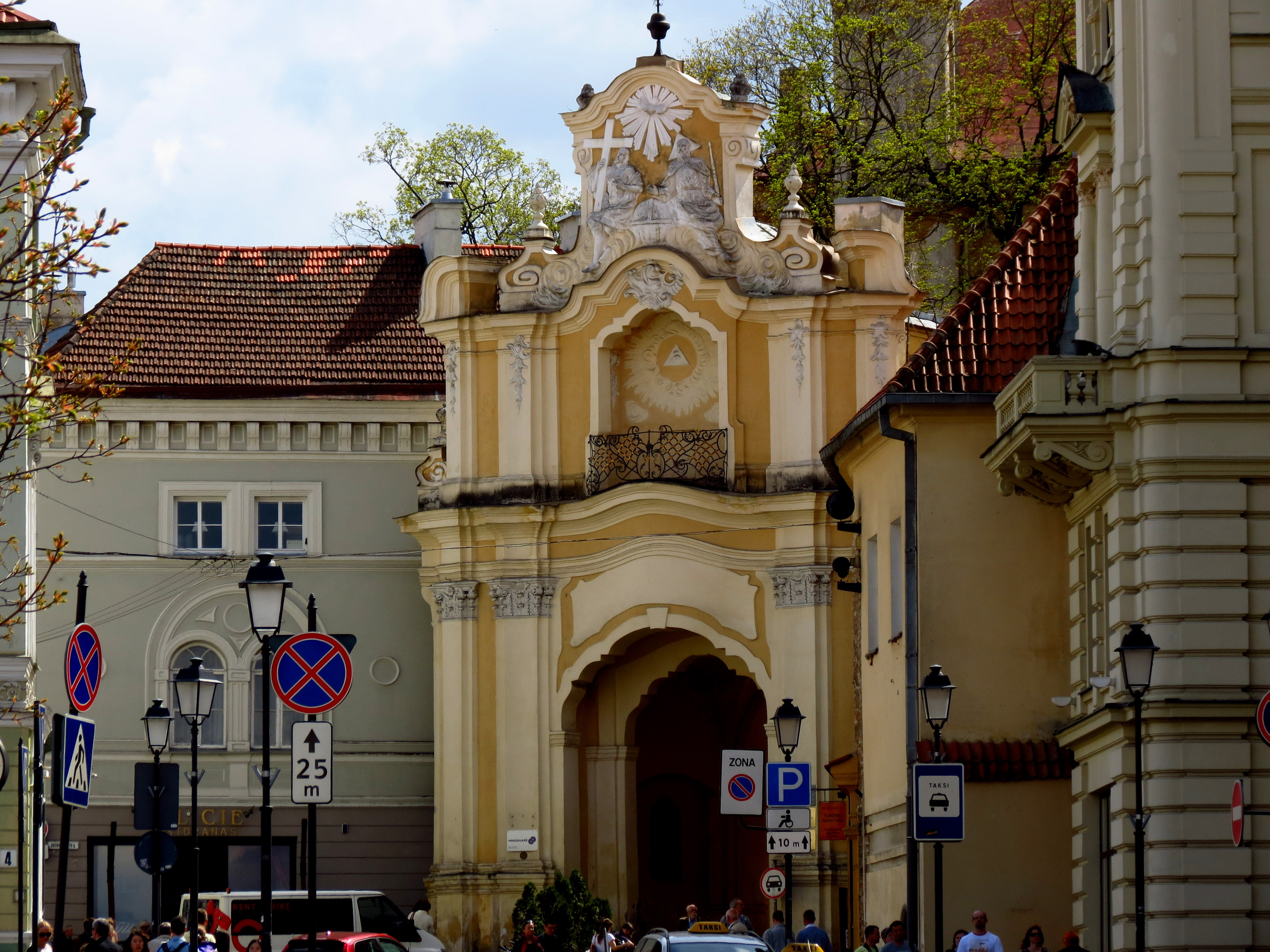
Gate of the Basilian Monastery, where Adam Mickiewicz was imprisoned for fighting Russian rule

Many writers were born in Vilnius, lived there, or are alumni of Vilnius University; they include Konstantinas Sirvydas, Maciej Kazimierz Sarbiewski, Antoni Gorecki, Józef Ignacy Kraszewski, Antoni Edward Odyniec, Michał Józef Römer, Adam Mickiewicz, Władysław Syrokomla, Józef Mackiewicz, Romain Gary, Juliusz Słowacki, Simonas Daukantas, Mykolas Biržiška, Petras Cvirka, Kazys Bradūnas, Nobel laureate Czesław Miłosz. Vilnius Academy of Arts alumnae have also added to the internationally acclaimed contemporary writers such as Jurga Ivanauskaitė, Undinė Radzevičiūtė and Kristina Sabaliauskaitė. The first consideration of the First Statute of Lithuania took place in 1522 at the Seimas of the Grand Duchy of Lithuania. The code was drafted under the guidance of Grand Chancellor of Lithuania Albertas Goštautas in accordance with customary law, legislation, and canon and Roman law. It is Europe's first codification of secular law. Albertas Goštautas supported the use of Lithuanian in literature and protected Lithuanian authors (including Abraomas Kulvietis and Michael the Lithuanian) who criticised the use of Old Church Slavonic, and called refugees Old Believers as "Muscovite spies" in De moribus tartarorum, lituanorum et moscorum.

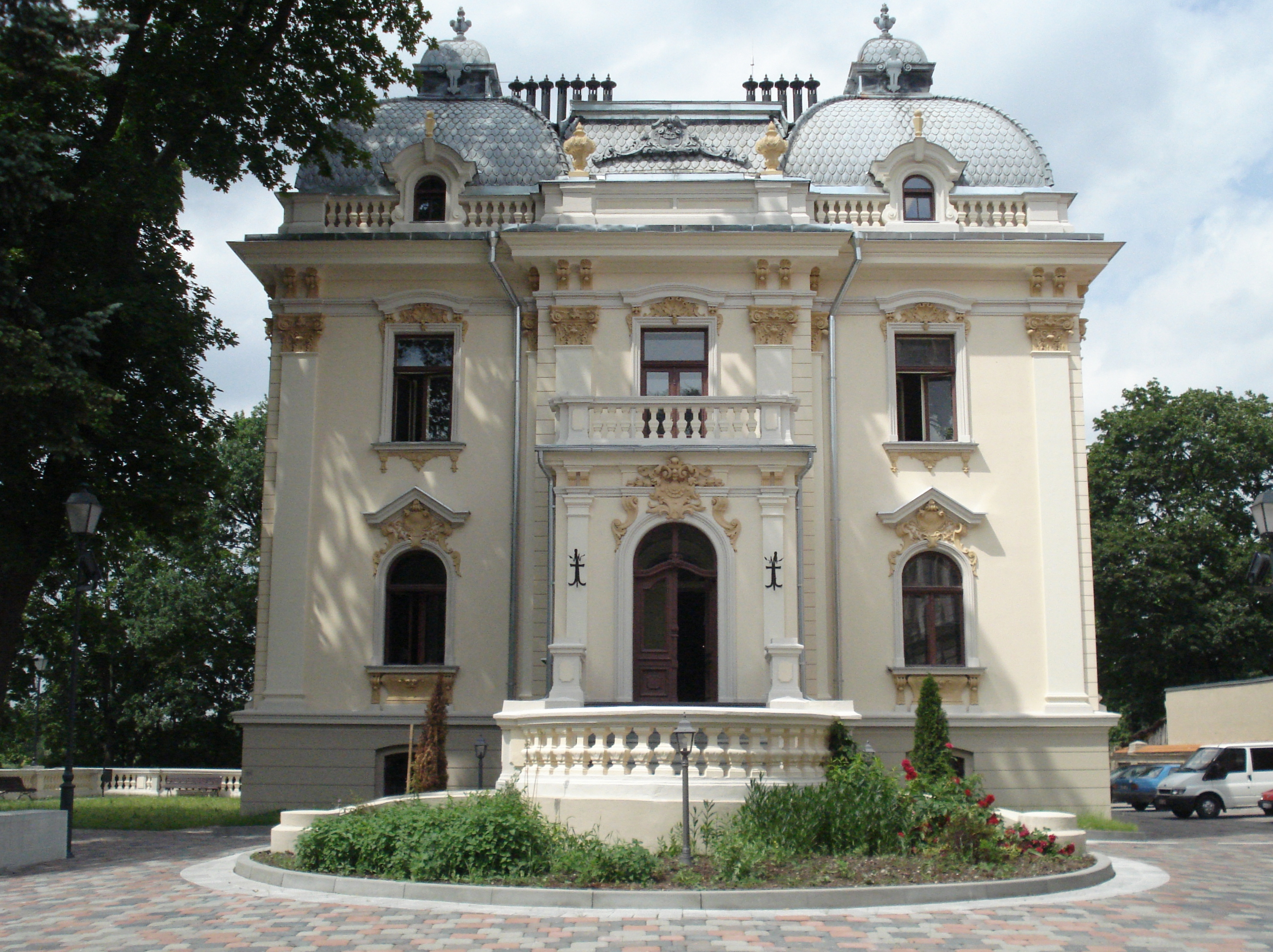
The Institute of Lithuanian Literature and Folklore in Vileišis Palace

Since the 16th century, the Lithuanian Metrica has been kept at the Lower Castle and safeguarded by the State Chancellor. Due to the deterioration of the books, Grand Chancellor Lew Sapieha ordered the Metrica recopied in 1594; the recopying continued until 1607. The recopied books were inventoried, rechecked, and transferred to a separate building in Vilnius; the older books remained in the Castle of Vilnius. According to 1983 data, 665 books remain on microfilm at the Lithuanian State Historical Archives in Vilnius.

Over 200 tiles and plaques commemorating writers who lived and worked in Vilnius and foreign authors connected to Vilnius and Lithuania adorn walls on Literatų Street (Lithuanian: Literatų gatvė) in the Old Town, outlining the history of Lithuanian literature. The Institute of Lithuanian Literature and Folklore and the Lithuanian Writers' Union are in the city. The Vilnius book fair is held annually at LITEXPO, the Baltics' largest exhibition centre.

=== Cinema ===
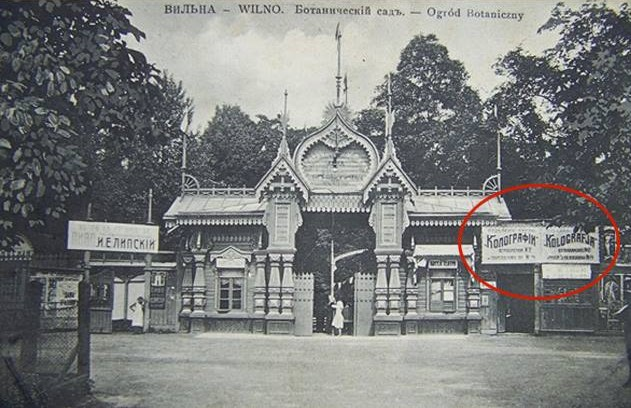
Billboard above the Botanical Garden main gate of the first film screening in Vilnius (1896)

The first public film session in Vilnius was held in the Botanical Garden (now the Bernardinai Garden) in July 1896. It was held after 1895 film sessions by Auguste and Louis Lumière in Paris. The session in Vilnius showed the Lumière brothers' documentary films. The first films shown were educational, filmed outside Vilnius (in India and Africa), and introduced other cultures. Georges Méliès' film, A Trip to the Moon, was first shown at the Lukiškės Square movie theater in 1902; it was the first feature film shown in Vilnius.

The first movie theater in Vilnius, Iliuzija (Illusion), opened in 1905 at 60 Didžioji Street. The first movie theaters, similar to theatres, had boxes with more-expensive seats. Because early films were silent, showings were accompanied by orchestral performances. Cinema screenings were sometimes combined with theatrical performances and illusion shows.

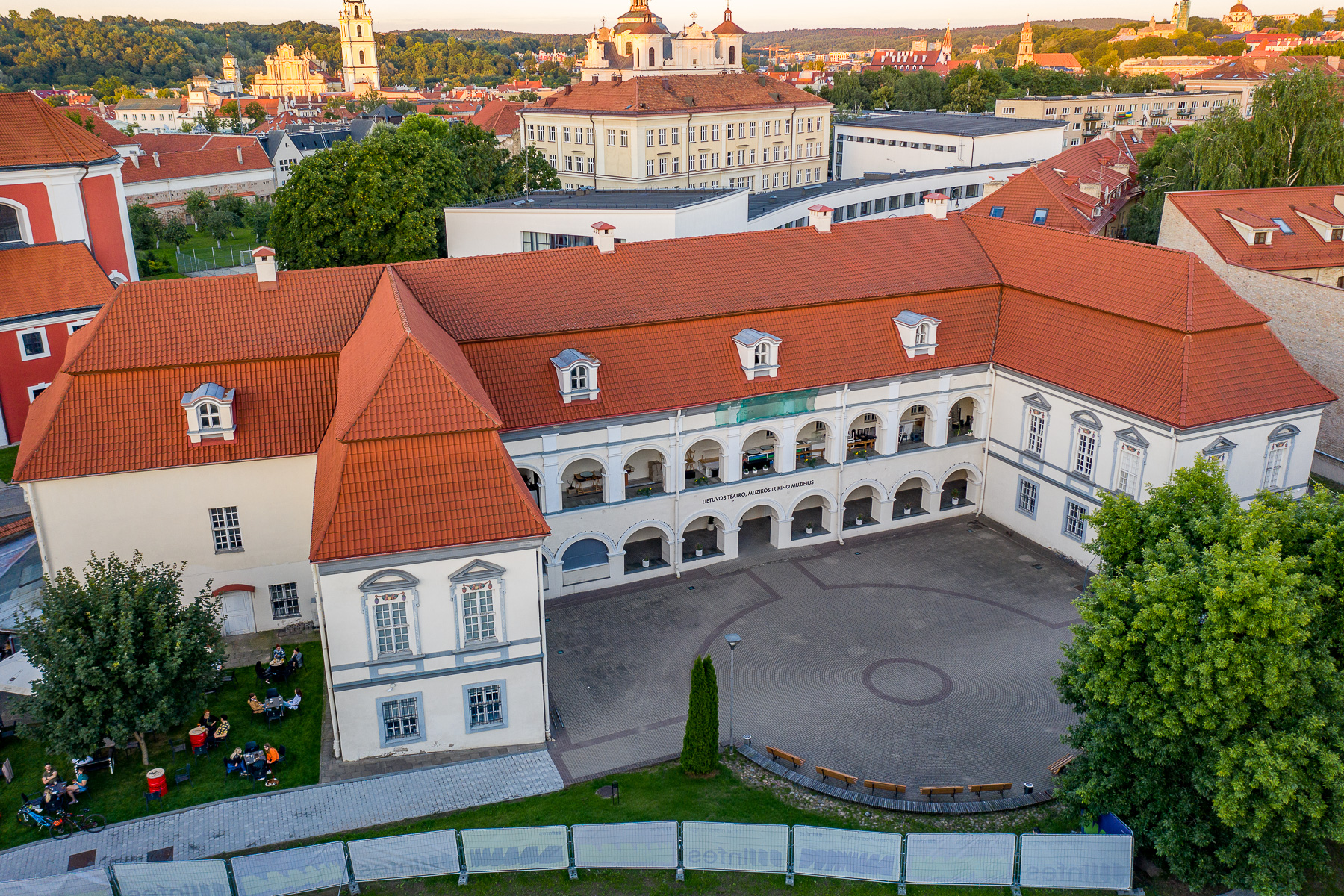
The Lithuanian Theater, Music and Cinema Museum, in the 17th-century Minor Radvilos Palace

On 4 June 1924, the Vilnius magistrate established a 1,200-seat movie theater in the city hall (Polish: Miejski kinematograf, City Movie Theater) to provide cultural education for students and adults. In 1926, 502,261 tickets were sold; 24,242 tickets were given to boarding children, 778 to tourists, and 8,385 to soldiers. In 1939, Lithuanian authorities renamed it Milda. The last city government gave it to the People's Commissariat of Education, which established the Lithuanian National Philharmonic Society, the following year.

In 1965, Lithuania's most modern movie theater (Lietuva) opened in Vilnius; it had over 1.84 million visitors per year, and an annual revenue of over 1 million roubles. After reconstruction, it had one of Europe's largest screens: 200 square metres (2,200 sq ft). Closed in 2002, it was demolished in 2017 and replaced by MO Museum. Kino Pavasaris is the city's largest film festival. The Lithuanian Film Centre (Lithuanian: Lietuvos kino centras), tasked with promoting the development and competitiveness of the Lithuanian film industry, is in Vilnius.

=== Music ===
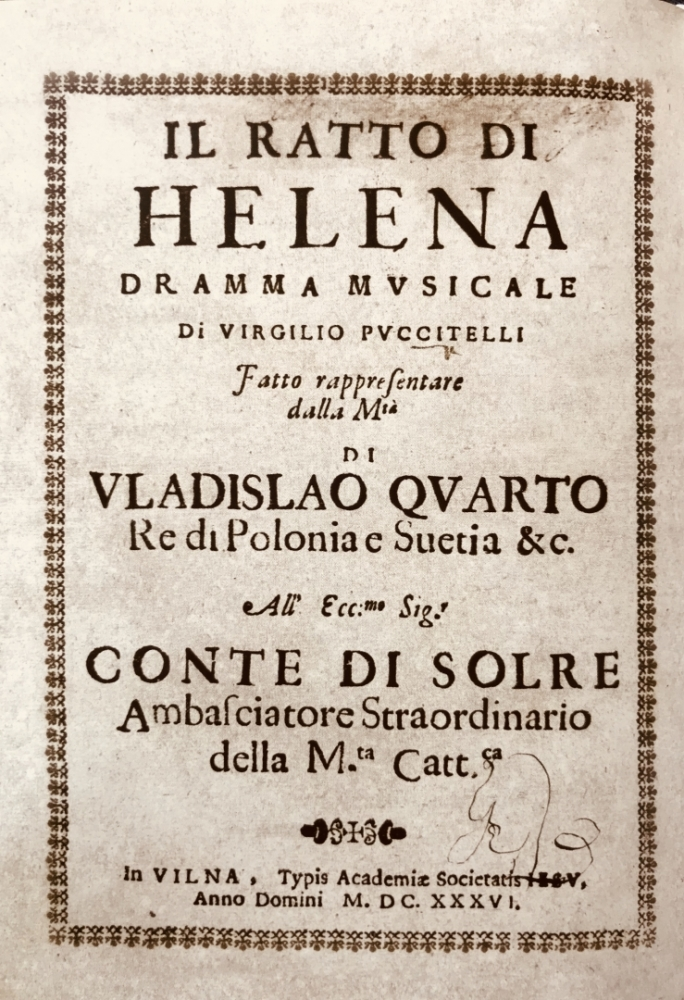
Libretto of the first opera staged in Vilnius (1636), before the first operas in Paris (1645) and London (1656)

Musicians performed at the Palace of the Grand Dukes of Lithuania as early as the 14th century, since Grand Duke Gediminas' daughter Aldona of Lithuania was known to be enthusiastic about music. Aldona brought court musicians and singers to Kraków after marrying King Casimir III the Great. During the 16th century, composers such as Wacław of Szamotuły, Jan Brant, Heinrich Finck, Cyprian Bazylik, Alessandro Pesenti, Luca Marenzio, and Michelagnolo Galilei lived in Vilnius; the city was also home to virtuoso lutist Bálint Bakfark. One of the first local musicians in written sources was Steponas Vilnietis (Stephanus de Vylna). The first textbook of Lithuanian music, The Art and Practice of Music (Latin: Ars et praxis musica), was published in Vilnius by Žygimantas Liauksminas in 1667.

Italian artists produced Lithuania's first opera on 4 September 1636 at the Palace of the Grand Dukes, commissioned by Grand Duke Władysław IV Vasa. Operas are produced at the Lithuanian National Opera and Ballet Theatre and by the Vilnius City Opera.

The Lithuanian National Philharmonic Society, the country's largest and oldest state-owned concert organization, produces live concerts and tours in Lithuania and abroad. The Lithuanian State Symphony Orchestra, founded by Gintaras Rinkevičius, performs in Vilnius.

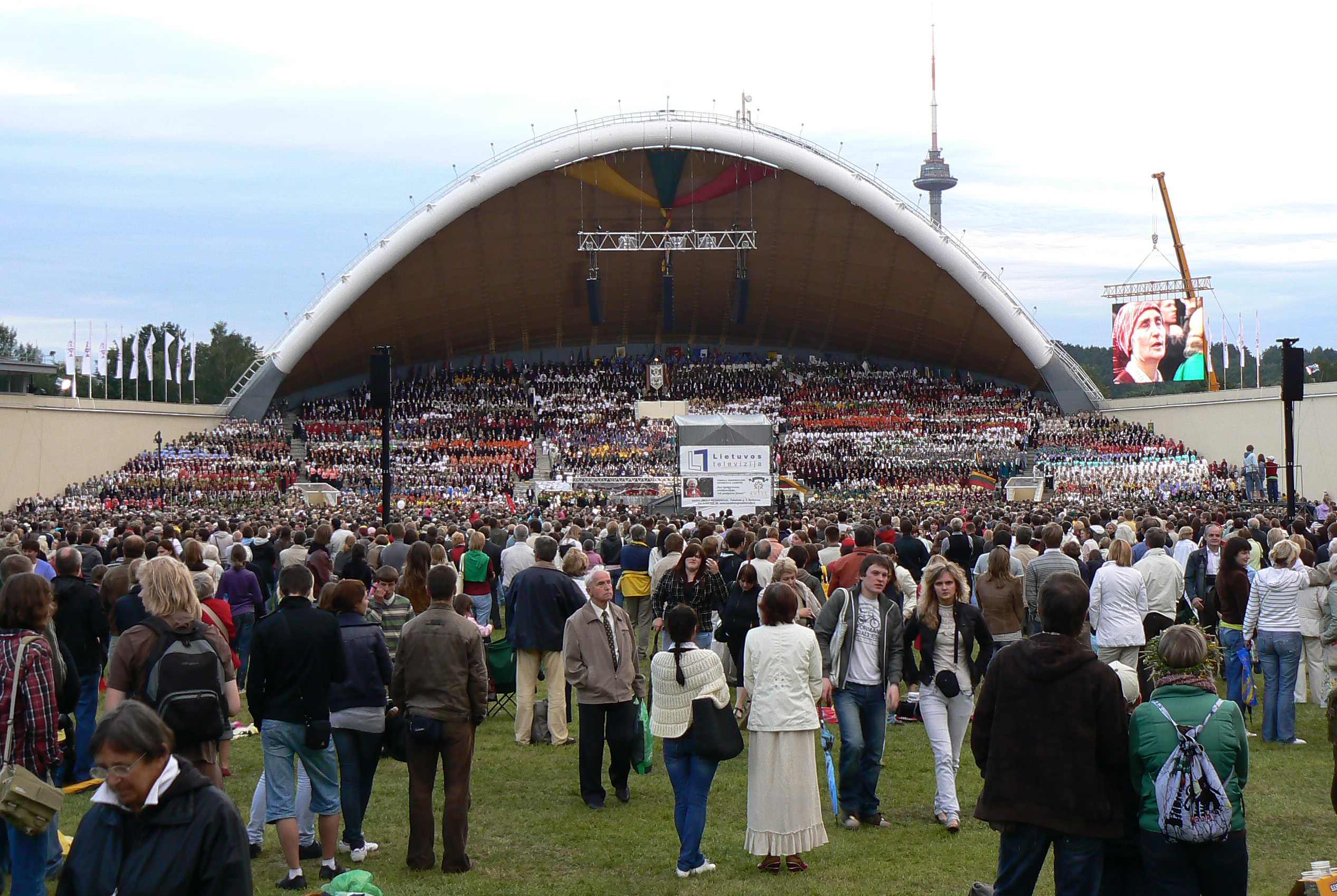
The Lithuanian Song and Dance Festival in Vingis Park

Choral music is popular in Lithuania, and Vilnius has three choir laureates (Brevis, Jauna Muzika, and the Chamber Choir of the Conservatoire) at the European Grand Prix for Choral Singing. The Lithuanian Song and Dance Festival in Vilnius has been presented every four years since 1990 for about 30,000 singers and folk dancers in Vingis Park. In 2008, the festival and its Latvian and Estonian counterparts were designated as a UNESCO Masterpiece of the Oral and Intangible Heritage of Humanity.

The jazz scene is active in Vilnius; in 1970–71, the Ganelin/Tarasov/Chekasin trio founded the Vilnius Jazz School. The Vilnius Jazz Festival is held annually.

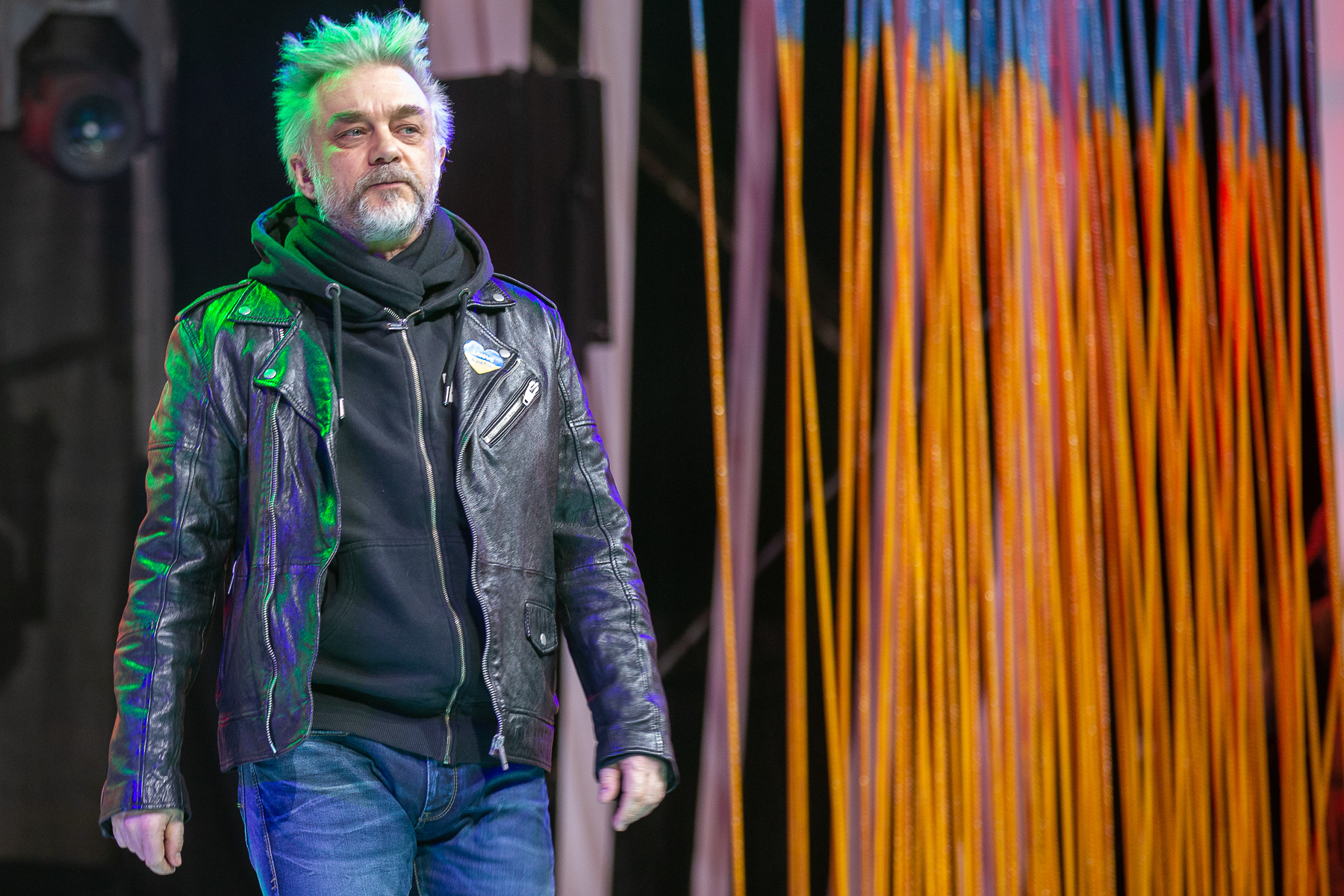
Andrius Mamontovas, leader of Foje and founder of the annual Gatvės muzikos diena (Street Music Day)

The annual Gatvės muzikos diena (Street Music Day) gathers musicians on the city's streets. Vilnius is the birthplace of singers Mariana Korvelytė – Moravskienė, Paulina Rivoli, Danielius Dolskis, Vytautas Kernagis, Algirdas Kaušpėdas, Andrius Mamontovas, Nomeda Kazlaus, and Asmik Grigorian); composers César Cui, Felix Yaniewicz, Maximilian Steinberg, Vytautas Miškinis, and Onutė Narbutaitė); conductor Mirga Gražinytė-Tyla), and musicians Antoni Radziwiłł, Jascha Heifetz, Clara Rockmore, and Romas Lileikis).

It was the hometown of 18th-century composers Michał Kazimierz Ogiński, Johann David Holland (colleague of C. Bach), Maciej Radziwiłł, and Michał Kleofas Ogiński. Nineteenth-century Vilnius was known for singer Kristina Gerhardi Frank, a close friend of Mozart and Haydn (who starred in the premiere of Haydn's Creation), mid-19th century guitar virtuoso Marek Konrad Sokołowski and composer Stanisław Moniuszko. The wealthiest woman in Vilnius during the early 19th century was singer Maria de Neri. In the early 20th century, Vilnius was the hometown of Mikalojus Konstantinas Čiurlionis, Mikas Petrauskas, and Juozas Tallat-Kelpša. Late-20th- and early 21st-century musicians include Vyacheslav Ganelin, Petras Vyšniauskas, Petras Geniušas, Mūza Rubackytė, Alanas Chošnau, and Marijonas Mikutavičius.

The Lithuanian Academy of Music and Theatre, headquartered on Gediminas Avenue, is also located at the Slushko Palace in Antakalnis. Singers who have lectured at the academy include tenors Kipras Petrauskas and Virgilijus Noreika.

=== Theatre ===
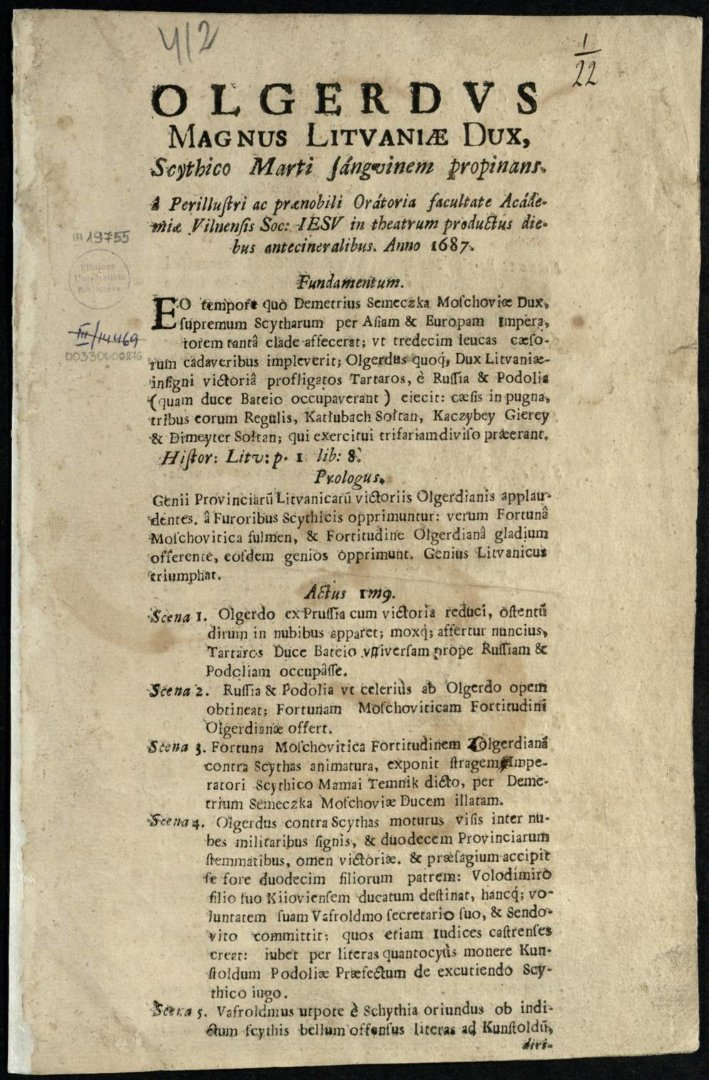
1687 Latin page of a theatre program dedicated to Algirdas, which was performed in Vilnius

The Lithuanian Grand Dukes' entertainment at the castle, rulers' visits abroad and guests' meetings had theatrical elements. During Sigismund III Vasa's residence in Vilnius in the early 17th century, English actors performed at the palace. Władysław IV Vasa established a professional opera theatre in the Lower Castle in 1635, where drammas per musica were performed by the Italian Virgilio Puccitelli. The performances had basic, luxurious scenography.

A Jesuit School Theatre existed between the 16th and 18th centuries, with its first performance (Hercules by S. Tucci) in 1570 in Vilnius. Baroque aesthetics prevailed at the theatre, which also had medieval retrospectives, Renaissance elements, Rococo motifs, and an educational function. Performances were in Latin, but elements of the Lithuanian language were included and some of the works had Lithuanian themes (plays dedicated to Algirdas, Mindaugas, Vytautas and other Lithuanian rulers).

Wojciech Bogusławski established Vilnius City Theatre, the city's first public theatre, in 1785. The theatre, initially in the Oskierka Palace, moved to the Radziwiłł Palace and Vilnius Town Hall. Plays were performed in Polish until 1845, from 1845 to 1864 in Polish and Russian, and after 1864 in Russian. After the Lithuanian-language ban was lifted, plays were also performed in Lithuanian. The theatre closed in 1914.

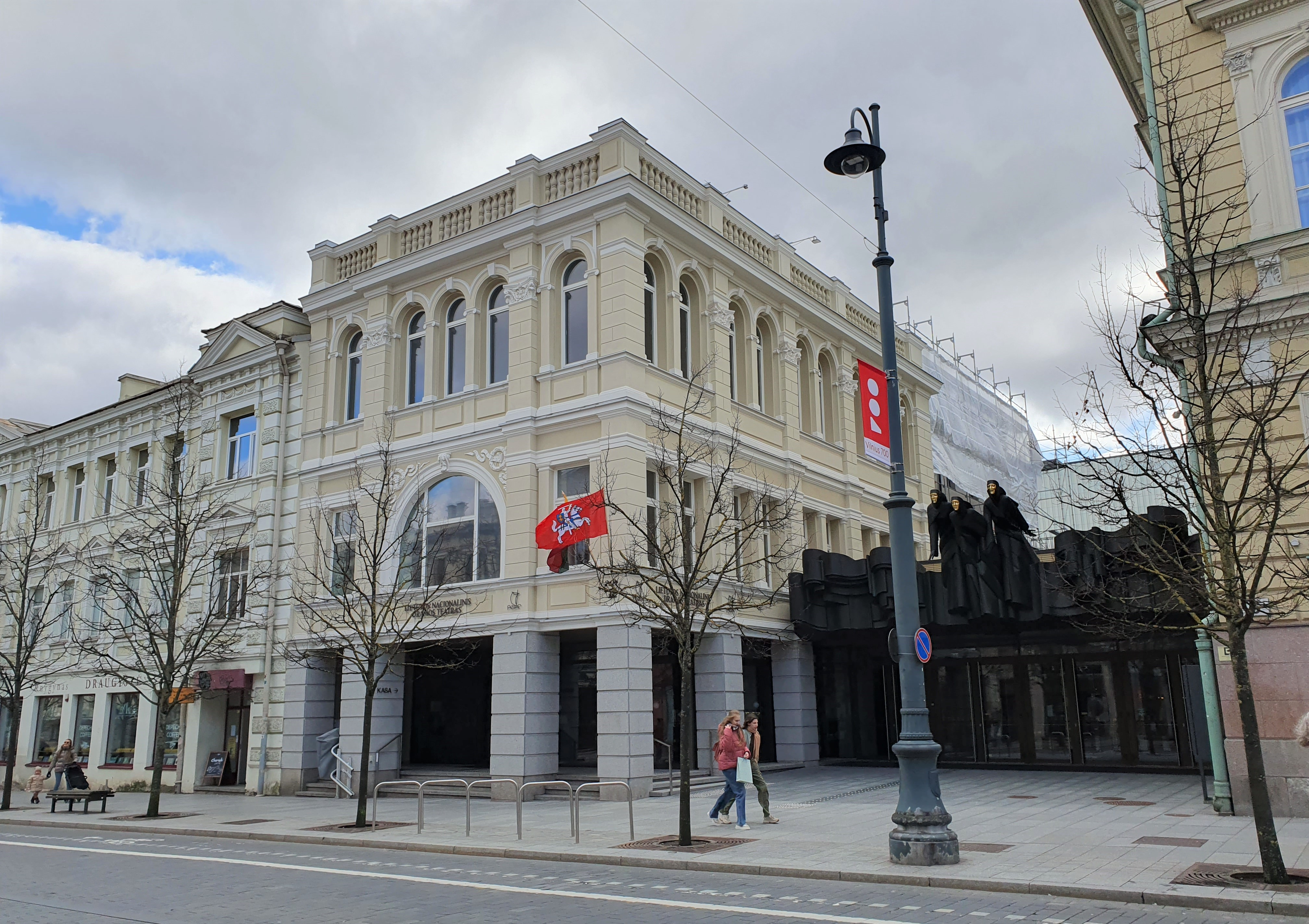
The Lithuanian National Drama Theatre

During the interwar period (when the city was part of Poland), Vilnius was known for the modern, experimental Reduta troupe and institute led by Juliusz Osterwa. The Vilnius Lithuanian Stage Amateur Company (Lithuanian: Vilniaus lietuvių scenos mėgėjų kuopa), established in 1930 and renamed Vilnius's Lithuanian Theatre, performed in the region. In 1945, it was merged with the Lithuanian National Drama Theatre.

After the Soviet occupation of Lithuania in 1940, theatre became a means of disseminating Soviet ideology. Performances incorporated socialist realism, and a number of revolutionary plays by Russian authors were staged. A Repertory Commission was established under the Ministry of Culture to direct theatres, control repertoire, and permit (or ban) performances.

Theatre changed after Lithuanian independence. The independent Vilnius City Opera blends classical and contemporary art. The Lithuanian National Drama Theatre, State Small Theatre of Vilnius, State Youth Theatre and a number of private theatre companies (including OKT/Vilnius City Theatre and the Anželika Cholina Dance Theatre) present classical, modern and Lithuanian plays directed by noted Lithuanian and foreign directors. There is also a Russian-language Old Theatre of Vilnius.

=== Photography ===
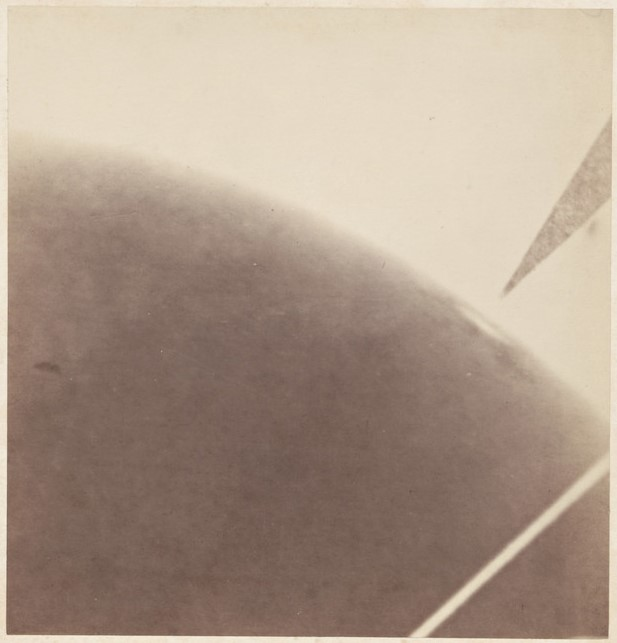
A coronal mass ejection, captured in 1867 with Vilnius's photoheliograph (the second such device in the world)

According to the memoirs of architect Bolesław Podczaszyński, published in January 1853 in the Gazeta Warszawska, Lithuanian photography began with the daguerreotyping in the summer of 1839 of the reconstructed Verkiai Palace by François Marcillac (governor of the children of Duke Ludwig Wittgenstein). The country's unfavorable political situation hampered the development of new technology and cultural activities. The first known daguerreotype-portrait atelier in Vilnius was opened in 1843 by C. Ziegler, and ateliers operated in Lithuania until 1859. One of the best-known photographers was K. Neupert, from Norway.

In the 1860s, with the spread of the collodion process, glass negatives and albumen paper were used instead of daguerreotype plates. Photo portraits in standard formats became widespread, and commercial photography ateliers were established in Vilnius and other Lithuanian cities. The first landscape and architectural photographs were made by Vilnius photographers Abdonas Korzonas and Albert Swieykowski, who compiled the 32-image Vilnius Album (Lithuania's first set of photographs). In 1862, Provisional Censorship Regulations governing the activities of photographic institutions were adopted in 1862, supervised by the Central Press Board of the Ministry of the Interior. Those who photographed the rebels in the January Uprising were punished; A. Korzonas was deported to Siberia. Other prominent 19th-century photographers were Stanisław Filibert Fleury (a stereoscopic-photography pioneer), Aleksander Władysław Strauss, and Józef Czechowicz.

The world's second photoheliograph was installed in 1865 at the Vilnius University Astronomical Observatory, and photographed sunspots. An unprecedented system of photographing solar dynamics began in 1868 in Vilnius. Jan Bułhak founded the country's first photography club in Vilnius in 1927. In 1952, Švyturys magazine organized the city's first photography exhibition.

=== Crafts ===
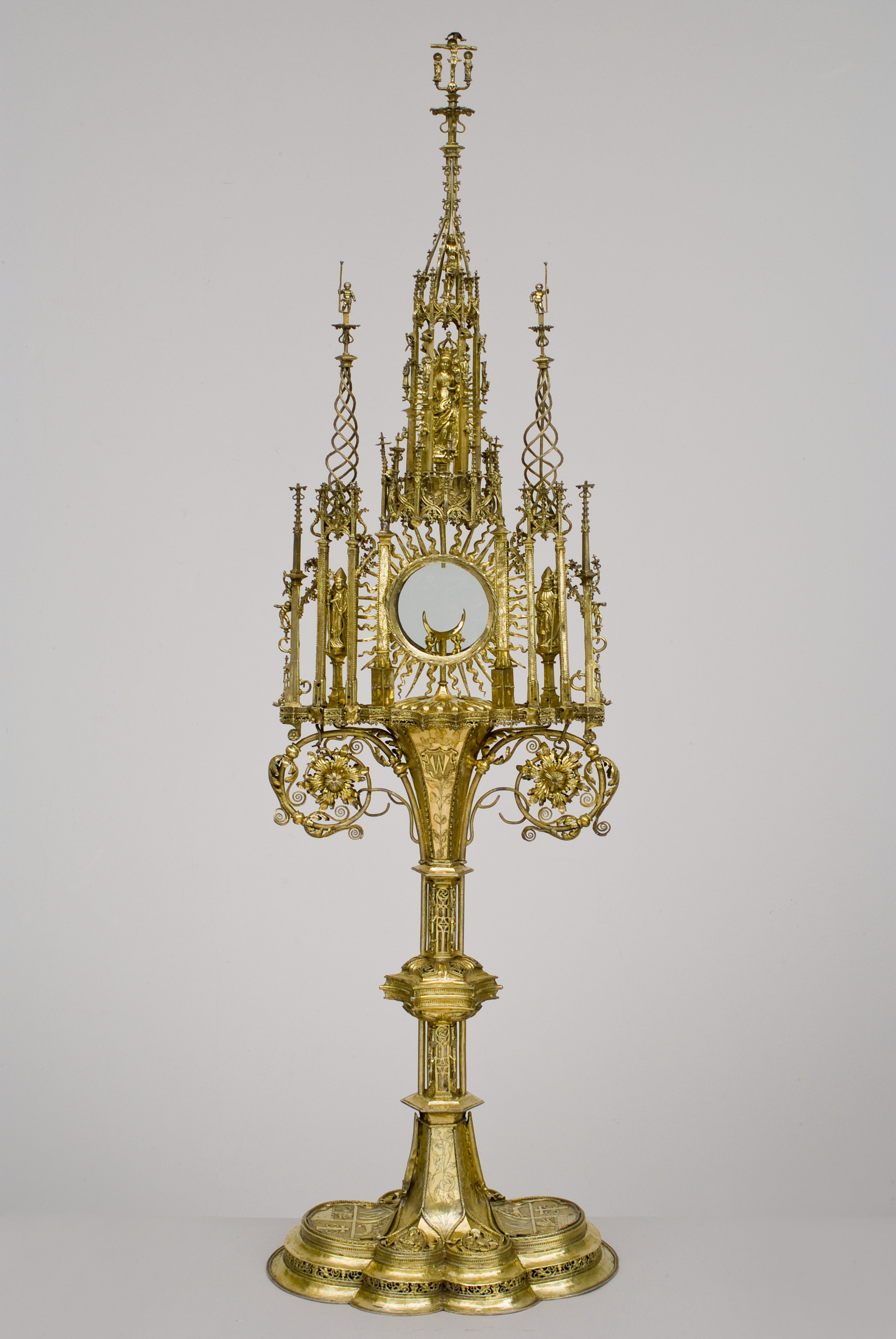
The Great Monstrance, commissioned in Vilnius in 1535 by Albertas Goštautas, is one of central Europe's largest.

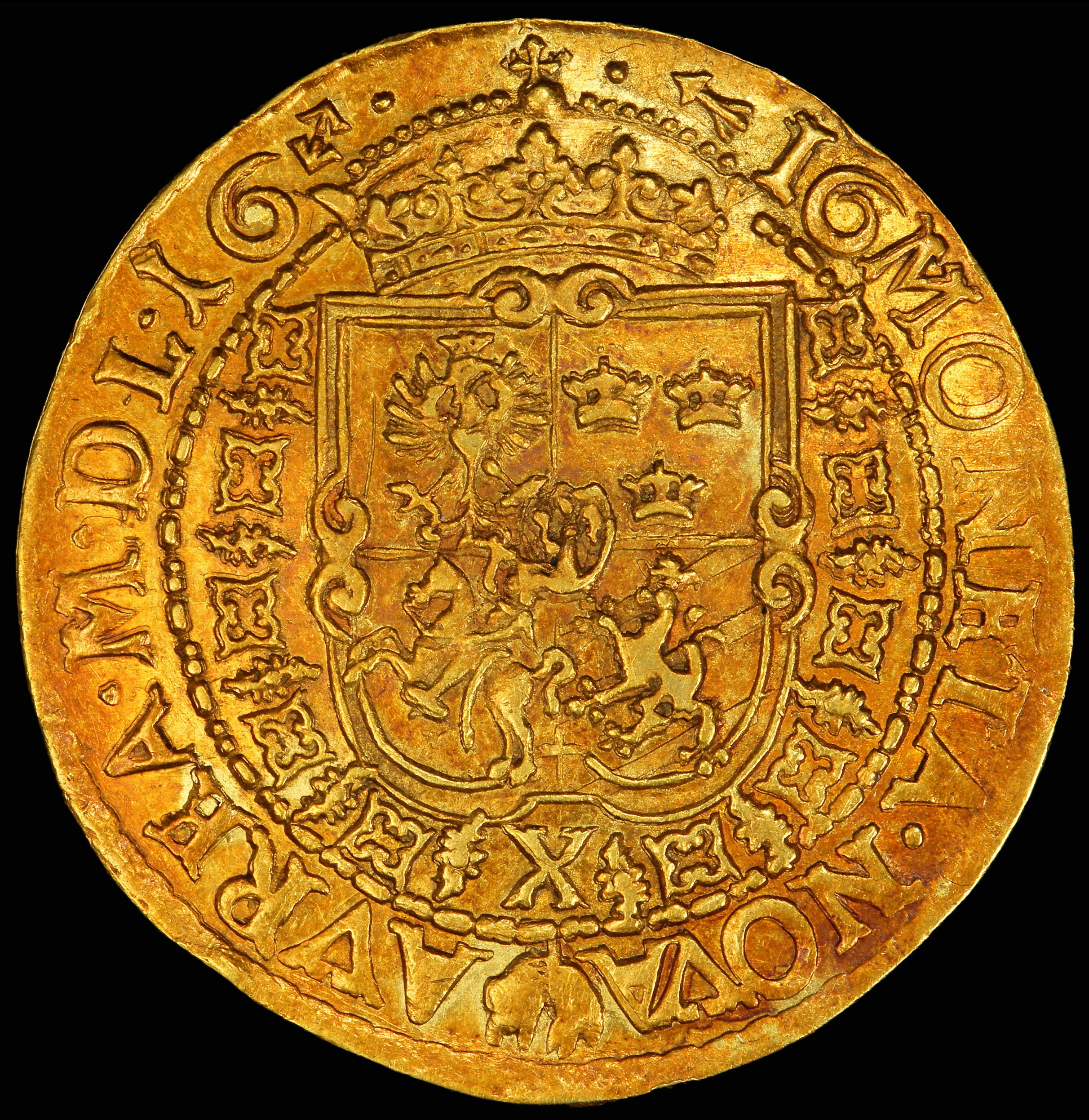
Reverse of Sigismund III Vasa's 10-ducat gold coin, struck in the Vilnius Mint in 1616, with the coat of arms of the Polish–Lithuanian Commonwealth and the privy marks of the Grand Treasurer of Lithuania, Hieronim Wołłowicz

Iron tools, weapons, brass, glass and silver jewelry have been produced in present-day Lithuania since the first century. Pottery wood products, and weaving became widespread in the second and fourth centuries. During the feudal era, home crafts were components of a subsistence economy. During the 13th and 14th centuries, crafts became a branch of the economy separate from agriculture. The Grand Dukes of Lithuania promoted the development of crafts in cities, and weaving, shoemaking, fur-making and other crafts predominated. With the early-14th-century introduction of foreign artisans, the development of crafts accelerated; crafts and trade stimulated the growth of Vilnius and other Lithuanian cities. In the 14th and 15th centuries, crafts were specialized (especially the production of tools, household items, fabrics, clothing, weapons, and jewelry); workshops were established which trained and defended the interests of craftspeople. Production of fine glassware began, goldsmithing was developed, and the level of pottery and weaving rose during the 16th century, and the 1529 and 1588 Statutes of Lithuania identify 25 crafts. European goldsmiths worked in the Vilnius Goldsmiths' Workshop (established in 1495), which controlled trade in precious metals and gemstones and served the Daugava and Dnieper regions, the Catholic Church, the Grand Duke, the nobility, and townspeople. The Vilnius Mint, the main mint of the Grand Duchy of Lithuania, minted the Lithuanian denarius, shillings, groschen, thalers, ducats, and other coins from 1387 to 1666.

Crafting declined in the second half of the 17th century due to the Russo-Polish War, and most goods were imported and sold by Lithuanian and Polish nobles. It revived from the second half of the 18th century to the first half of the 19th century, with Vilnius the largest Lithuanian craft center. After the abolition of serfdom, craft schools were established in Lithuanian cities; crafts have prevailed in clothing manufacturing, goldsmithing, woodworking, food processing, and other fields. Under Soviet occupation, craftspeople worked in artels until 1960 and then in combines. After independence, crafts were produced by small and medium-sized businesses.

=== Language ===
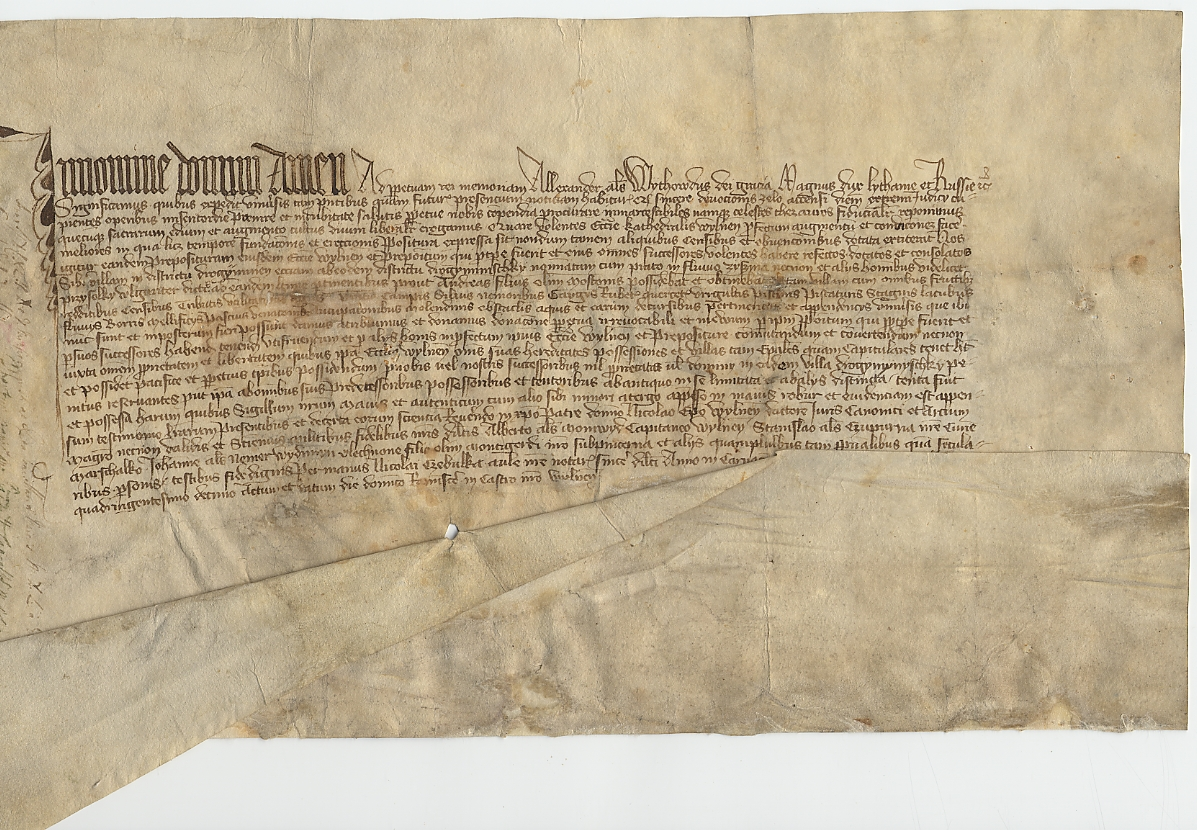
Edict issued by Vytautas the Great in Vilnius on 16 February 1410 in Latin

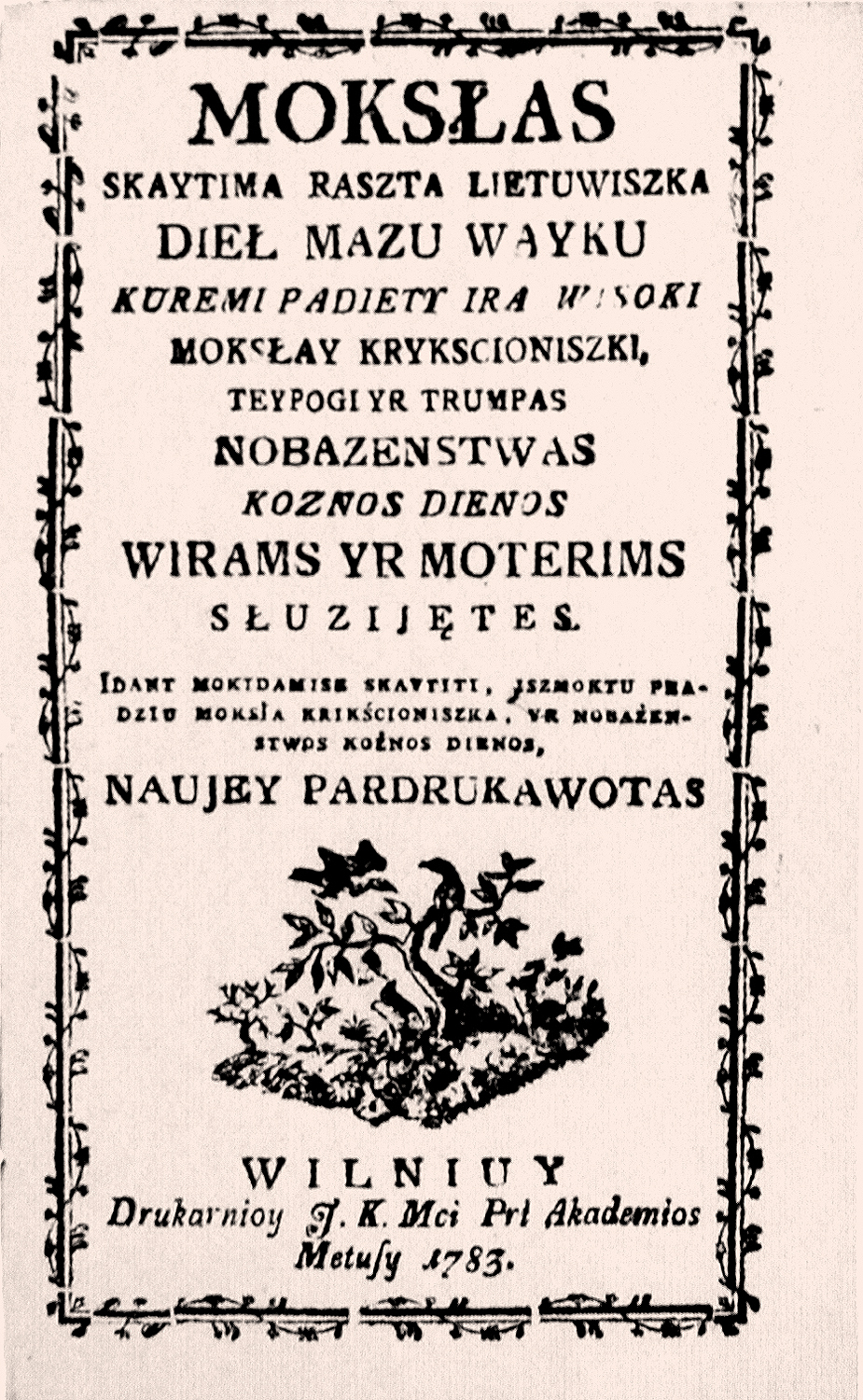
1783 Lithuanian language primer, published in Vilnius

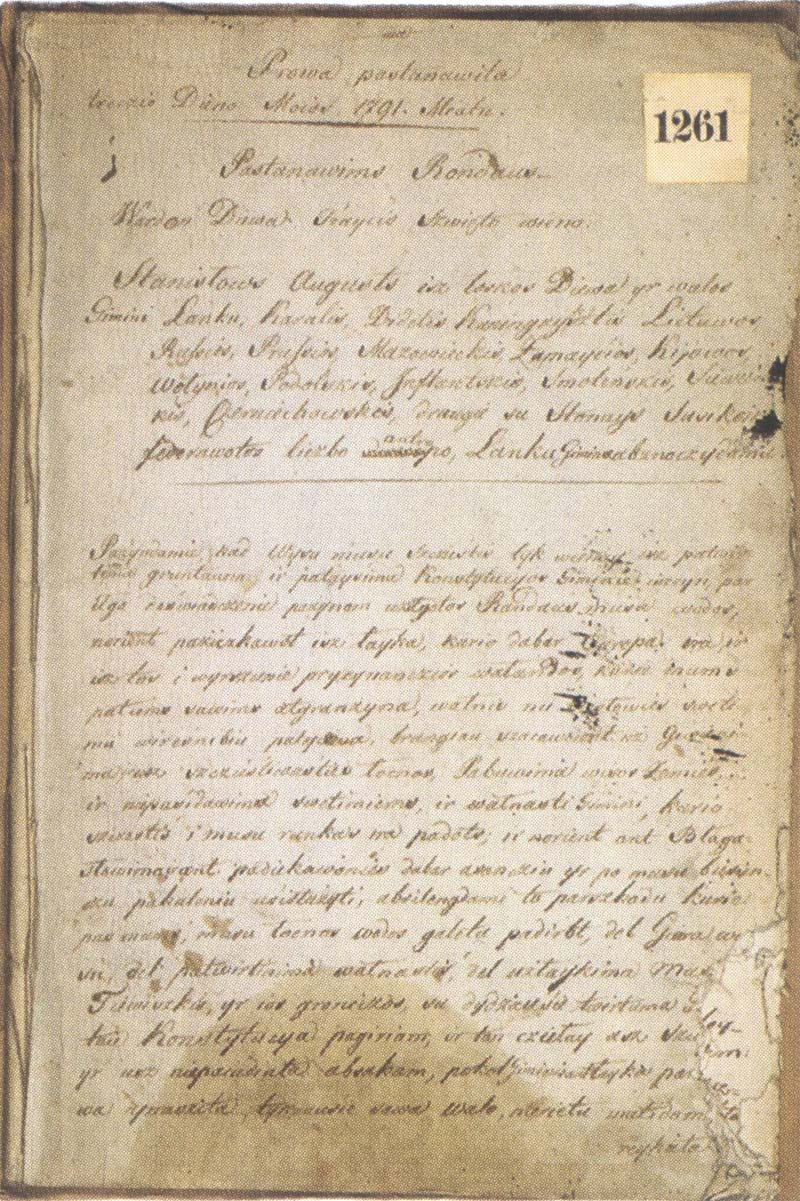
Manuscript of the Constitution of 3 May 1791 in Lithuanian

A multicultural city, Vilnius's language changed over the centuries. The predominant spoken language in medieval Lithuania was Lithuanian. It had no literary tradition, however, and was not used in writing except for religious texts such as the Lord's Prayer and the Hail Mary. Vytautas the Great spoke in Lithuanian with Jogaila, whose son Casimir IV Jagiellon also spoke Lithuanian. Saint Casimir, the patron saint of Lithuania, knew Lithuanian, Polish, German and Latin. Fifteenth-century Byzantine historian Laonikos Chalkokondyles reported that the Lithuanians had a distinct language. In the 15th to 18th centuries, the most common theory was that the Lithuanians hailed from the Roman people and the similarity of the Lithuanian language to Latin was emphasized.

Ruthenian was used after the incorporation of Kievan Rus', forming the basis of 19th-century Ukrainian and Belarusian. Written Ruthenian stemmed from the interaction of Church Slavonic and Old East Slavic with Ruthenian dialects, becoming the main language of the chancery of the Grand Duchy of Lithuania in the 14th and 15th centuries and maintained its dominance until the mid-17th century.

Latin and Polish were also widely used in the chancery; Polish replaced Ruthenian in written sources and Lithuanian in public use during the second half of the 17th century. The first state documents in Lithuanian appeared in the Grand Duchy of Lithuania at the end of its existence.

At the Vilnius court of Sigismund II Augustus, the last Grand Duke of Lithuania before the Union of Lublin, Polish and Lithuanian were spoken. In 1552, Sigismund ordered that orders from the Magistrate of Vilnius be announced in Lithuanian, Polish, and Ruthenian. Minorities such as Jews, Lipka Tatars, and Crimean Karaites were ruled by the Grand Duke of Lithuania, and their languages were only used among themselves. According to Article 14 of the Lithuanian constitution, Lithuanian is the official language; however, interpreter assistance is sometimes provided.

=== Fashion ===
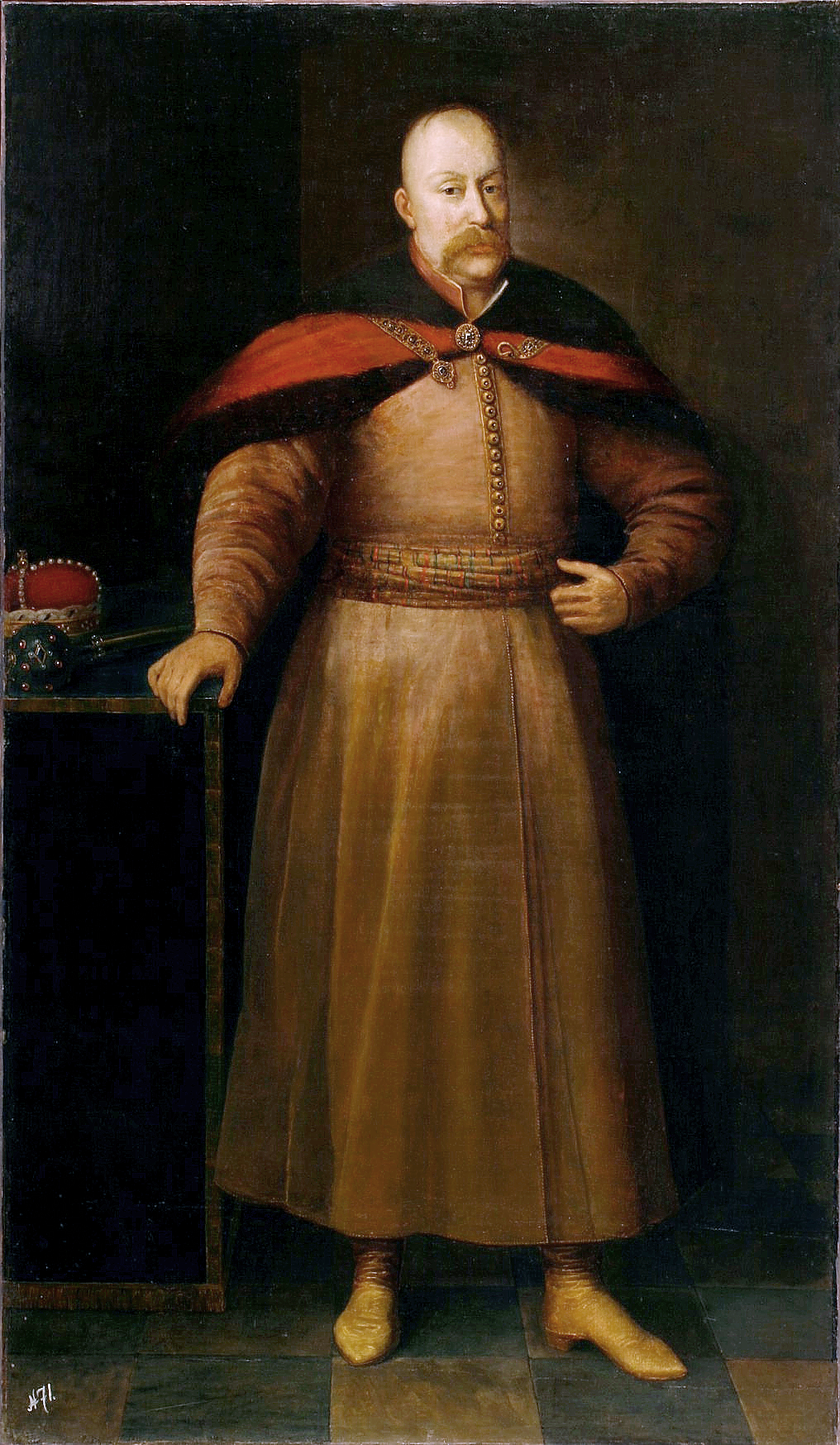
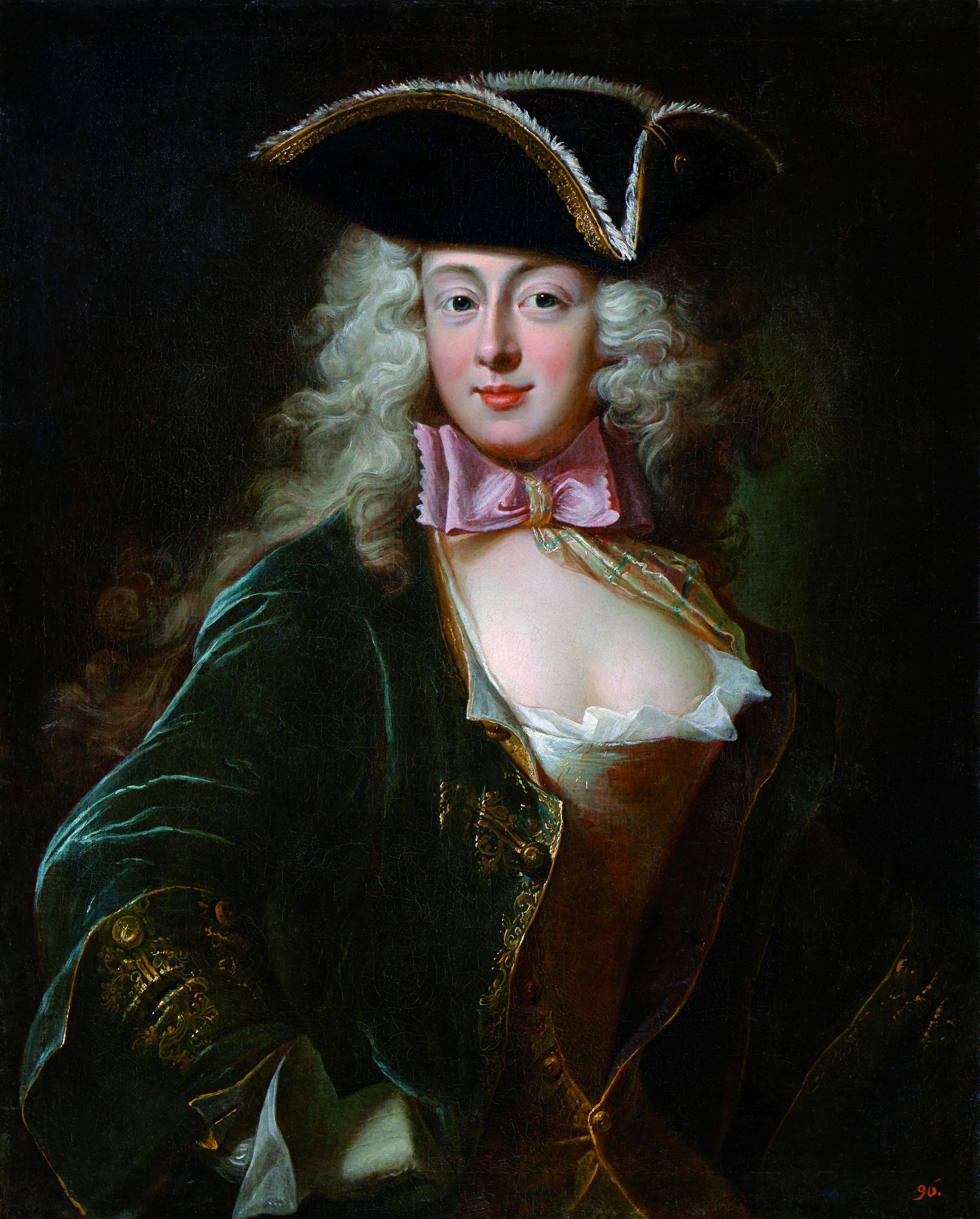
Janusz Radziwiłł (left), wearing a żupan and kontusz belt; Emerencjanna Pociej, wife of Ludwik Pociej, in Western European clothing

According to historian Antanas Čaplinskas, wives of merchants and craftsmen wore rings decorated with gemstones. Sixteenth- and seventeenth-century property inventories list long, wide-sleeved jackets (known as kontuszy), żupany decorated with fur, and kontusz belts. Buttons, made of pearl, coral, brilliant-cut diamonds and emeralds, were decorated with diamonds and enamel. Delias and dolmans were popular with townspeople and nobles.

Wealthy townspeople in luxurious clothing aroused the envy of Lithuanian nobility, who demanded laws regulating attire. The 1588 Statute of Lithuania limited townspeople to two rings, and Jews could not wear gold chains and brooches. Broader restrictions were imposed by the Sejm of the Polish–Lithuanian Commonwealth, which adopted the 1613 Act of Thrift forbidding non-noble townspeople from wearing expensive furs in public. Payment of a fee later removed the limitations.

During the late 18th century, almost all men shaved; their hair was short, and they wore open-front blue, green or black tailcoats and waistcoats with white or light-yellow trousers; women's clothing echoed West European styles. In the early 20th century, clothing followed West European fashion trends. The State Art Institute of Lithuania introduced clothing-design studies, and the Vilnius Model House (popularizing apparel and footwear) was established in 1961.

The annual Vilnius spring Mados infekcija (Fashion Infection), Lithuania's largest fashion show, began in 1999. Lithuanian clothing designer Juozas Statkevičius usually presents his shows in the city.

=== Holidays and festivals ===
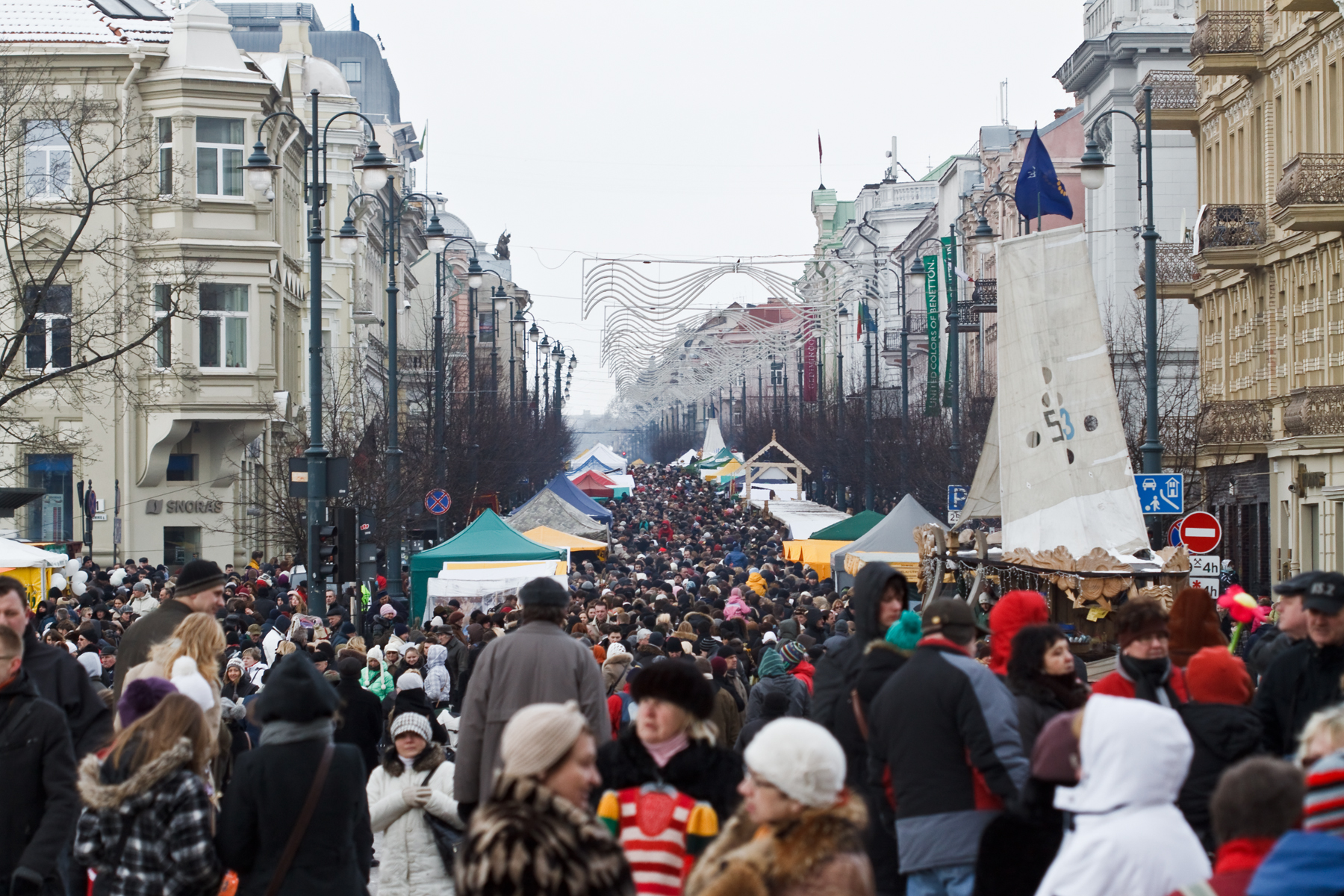
Kaziuko mugė is held each March to honor Saint Casimir

Catholic holidays such as Christmas, Easter, and Saint John's Eve) are widely celebrated. On 16 February (anniversary of the Act of Independence of Lithuania) and 11 March (anniversary of the Act of the Re-Establishment of the State of Lithuania), festive and religious events take place in Vilnius. On the evening of 12 January, bonfires are lit to commemorate the January Events.

Kaziuko mugė (Saint Casimir's Fair), held annually in the city's markets and streets on the Sunday nearest to 4 March (the feast of Saint Casimir), attracts many visitors and Lithuanian and foreign craftspeople. Easter palms (Lithuanian: Verbos) are symbolic of the fair. Capital Days (Lithuanian: Sostinės dienos), Vilnius's largest festival of music and culture, is held from 30 August to 1 September. The river Vilnia is dyed green every year for Saint Patrick's Day. During the annual Vilnius Culture Night, artists and cultural organisations hold events and performances throughout the city.

Since 2023, the Vilnius Pink Soup Fest is organised annually to celebrate the cold beetroot soup šaltibarščiai.

== Administration ==
=== Government ===
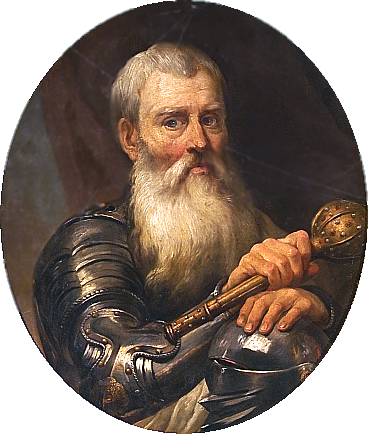
Krzysztof "Piorun" Radziwiłł was Voivode of Vilnius from 1584 to 1603. After his victories against Ivan the Terrible during the Livonian War, he was nicknamed "the Thunderbolt".

Before Magdeburg rights were granted to Vilnius in 1378, the city was ruled by vicegerents. Government was later granted to a magistrate or a city council, subordinate to the ruler. In wartime, it was led by a voivode. The government headquarters was at Vilnius Town Hall.

The magistrate was responsible for the city's economy: collecting taxes, overseeing the treasury, and accumulating stocks of grain to avoid starvation during famine or wars. He was a notary in transactions and testaments, a judge in conflicts involving construction and renovation, and took care of craftspeople; statutes involving workshops were approved by the ruler, but Sigismund II Augustus gave this responsibility to magistrates in 1552. Since a 1522 ruling by Sigismund I the Old, Vilnius magistrates had to protect the city and its residents with 24 armed guards. During wartime, the night watch was conducted by the magistrate, bishop and castle men.

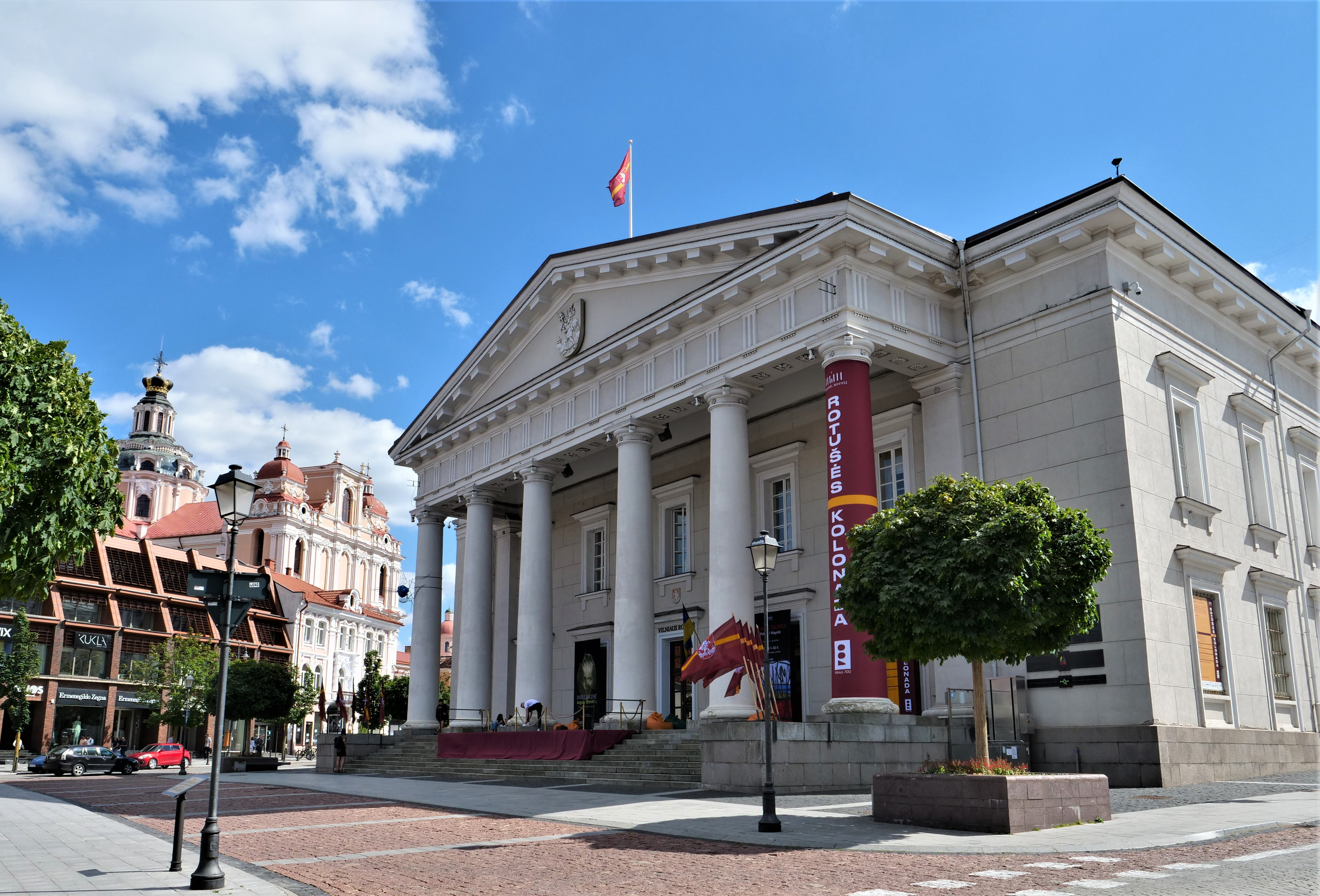
The neoclassical Town Hall, designed by Laurynas Gucevičius in 1799

The chief city administrator was a Catholic vaitas (a vicegerent of the Grand Duke of Lithuania), most of whom were beginning their careers in the magistracy, and chaired city-council meetings. He adjudicated criminal cases, with the right to impose capital punishment. Originally examining cases alone, two suolininkai also began examining important cases in the 16th century. At that time, the city council consisted of 12 burgomasters and 24 councilors; half were Catholics, the other half Orthodox). Members were chosen by wealthy townspeople, merchants, and workshop elders. Burgomasters were lifetime appointments; at death, another member of the council with the same religion was chosen. In 1536, Sigismund I the Old signed an edict prohibiting close relatives on the council and requiring prior agreement by the townspeople of new taxes, obligations and regulations.

The Vilnius City Municipality Building in Konstitucijos Avenue, which houses the city's municipal council and administration

Under the Russian Empire, the city council was replaced with a city duma. Vilnius was the capital of the Lithuania Governorate from 1797 to 1801, the Vilna Governorate-General from 1794 to 1912, and the Vilna Governorate from 1795 to 1915. After the Soviet occupation of Lithuania, Vilnius was the capital of the Lithuanian Soviet Socialist Republic.

==== Vilnius City Municipality ====
The Vilnius City Municipality is the representative self-government organ, one of 60 municipalities of Lithuania. In addition to Vilnius proper, it includes the town of Grigiškės, as well as the villages and rural areas of the Grigiškės eldership.

The Vilnius City Municipal Council, established in 1990, is elected to four-year terms, and candidates are nominated by political parties and committees. Beginning with the 2011 elections, independent candidates are permitted. Its executive organ is the Vilnius City Municipality Administration.

Before 2015, mayors were appointed by the council. Beginning that year, mayors were elected in a two-round system. Remigijus Šimašius was the city's first directly elected mayor.

=== Subdivisions ===
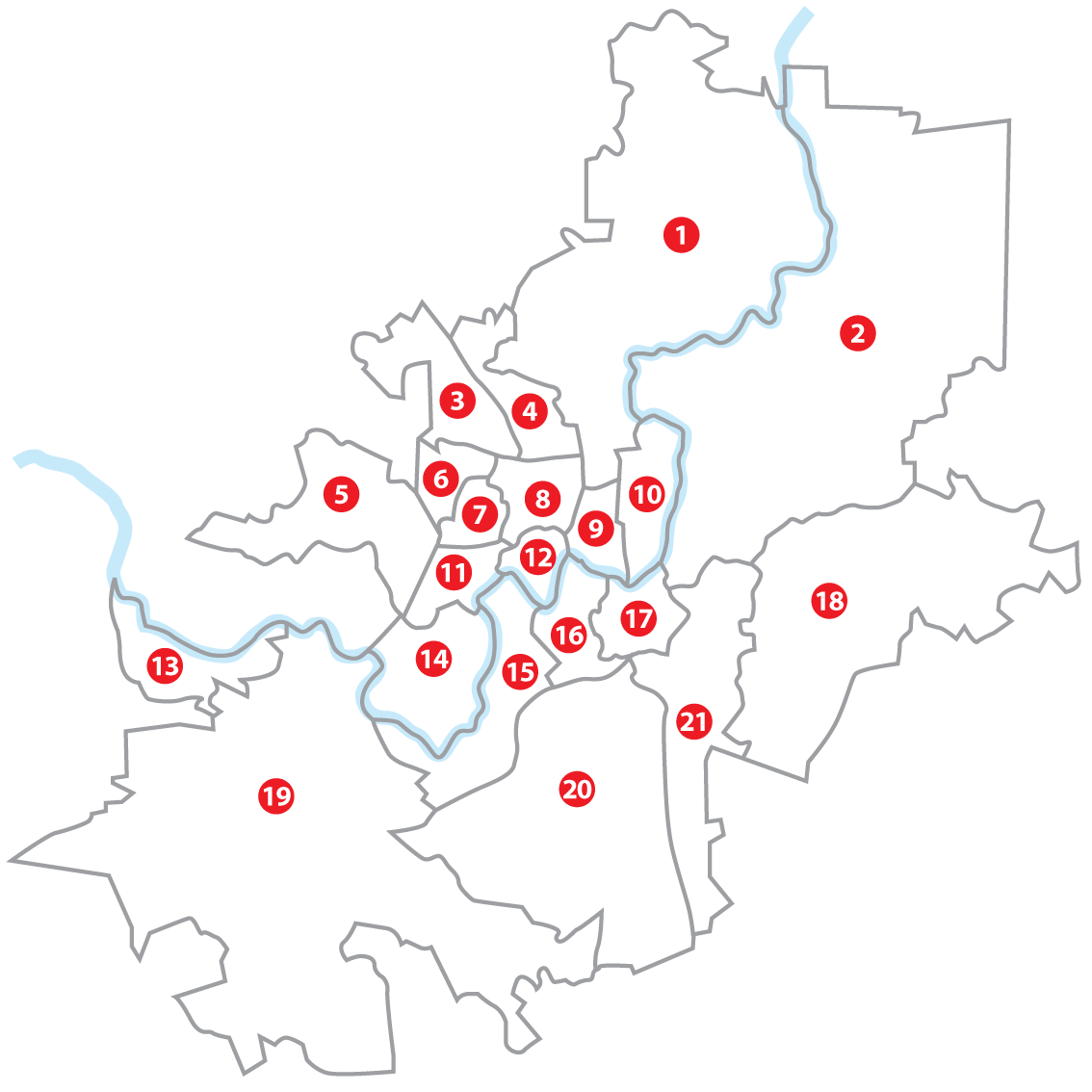
Map of Vilnius elderships. Numbers on the map correspond with numbers on the list.

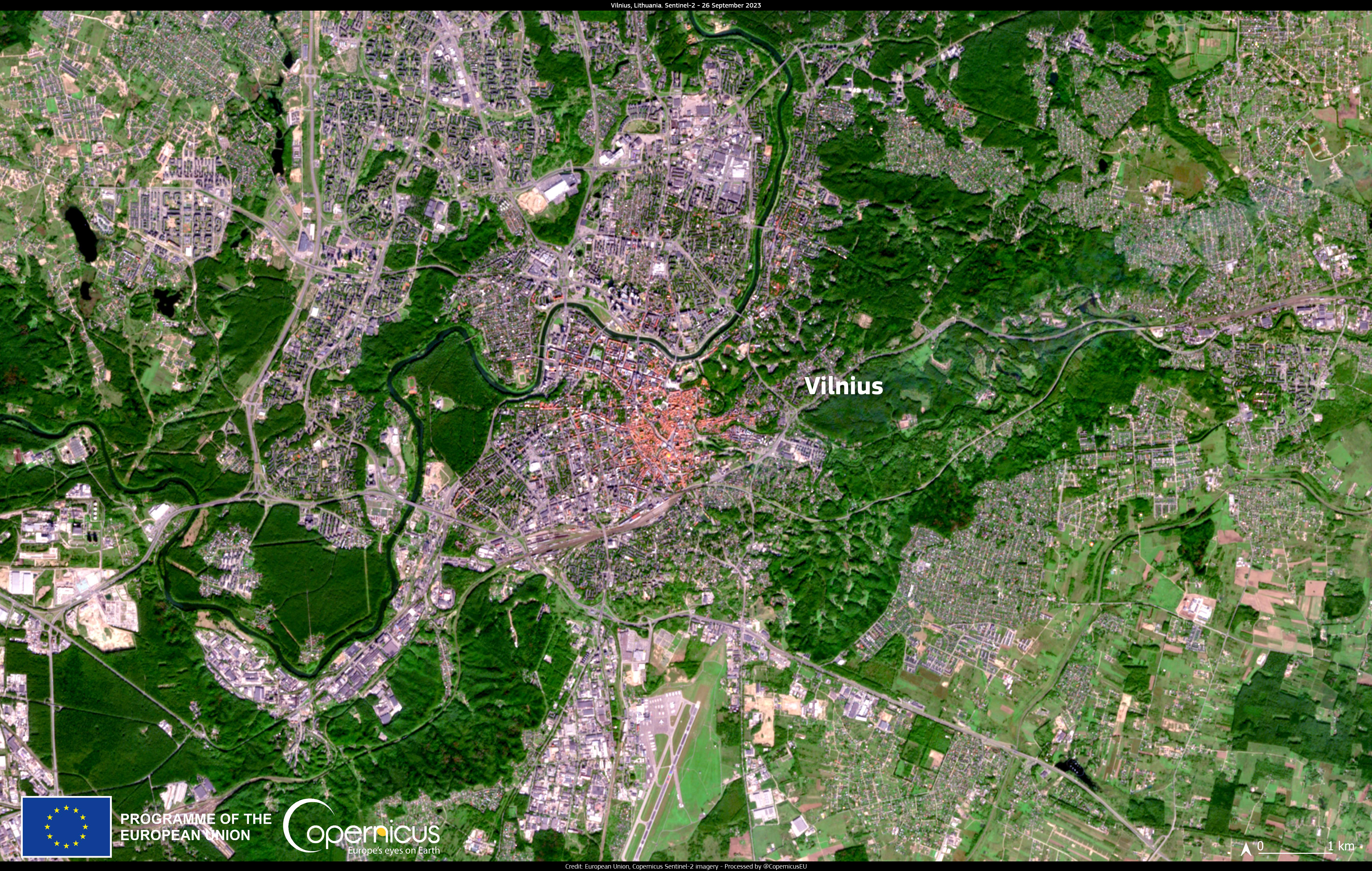
Copernicus Sentinel-2 image of Vilnius from space

Eldership	Area (km^{2})	Population	Density (per km^{2})	Map number
Antakalnis (includes Valakampiai, Turniškės, and Dvarčionys)	77.2	39,257	510	2
Fabijoniškės (includes Bajorai)	4.1	37,006	9,000	4
Grigiškės (a city)	7.1	10,335	1,500	13
Justiniškės	3.0	25,956	8,700	6
Karoliniškės	4.0	24,751	6,200	11
Lazdynai	9.9	30,945	3,100	14
Naujamiestis (includes bus and train stations)	4.9	28,157	5,700	16
Naujininkai (includes Kirtimai, Salininkai, and Vilnius Čiurlionis International Airport)	41.1	30,030	730	20
Naujoji Vilnia (includes Pavilnys and Pūčkoriai)	39.3	36,800	940	18
Paneriai (includes Trakų Vokė and Gariūnai)	84.8	11,149	130	19
Pašilaičiai (includes Tarandė)	7.9	40,384	5,100	3
Pilaitė	13.9	28,234	2,000	5
Rasos (includes Belmontas and Markučiai)	16.3	10,230	630	21
Senamiestis (Old Town) (includes Užupis)	4.5	21,782	4,800	17
Šeškinė	4.4	28,137	6,400	8
Šnipiškės	3.1	16,474	5,300	9
Verkiai (includes Baltupiai, Jeruzalė, Santariškės, Balsiai, and Visoriai)	55.7	50,754	910	1
Vilkpėdė (includes Vingis Park)	10.8	19,325	1,800	15
Viršuliškės	2.5	13,877	5,600	7
Žirmūnai (includes Šiaurės miestelis and Tuskulėnai)	5.7	43,453	8,600	10
Žvėrynas	2.6	12,089	4,700	12

=== Vilnius District Municipality ===
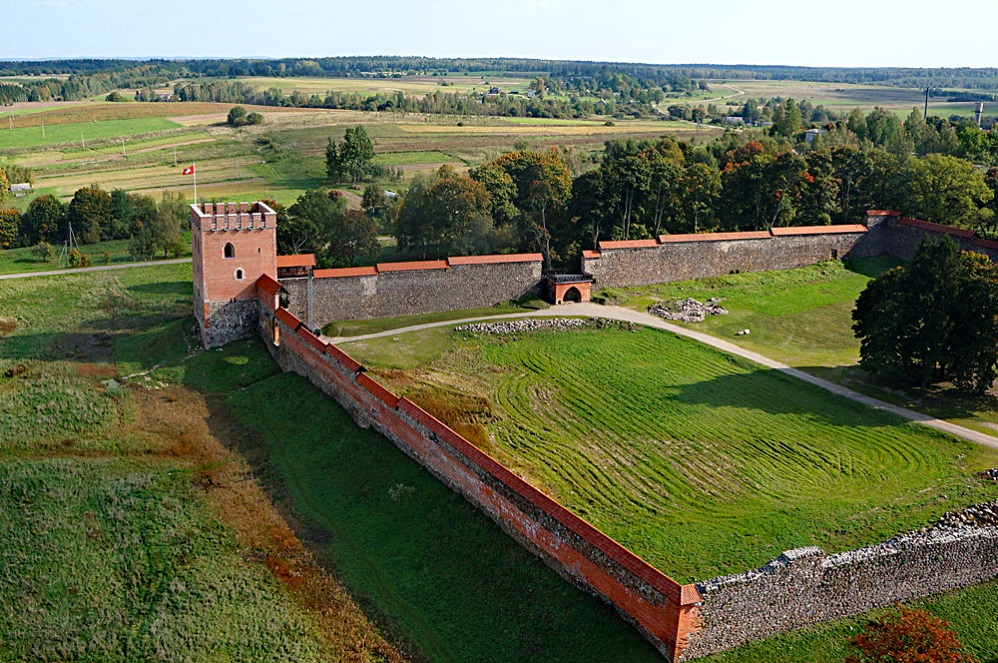
Medininkai Castle, built in the first half of the 14th century. It is the largest enclosure-type defensive castle in Lithuania and a primary landmark in the district.

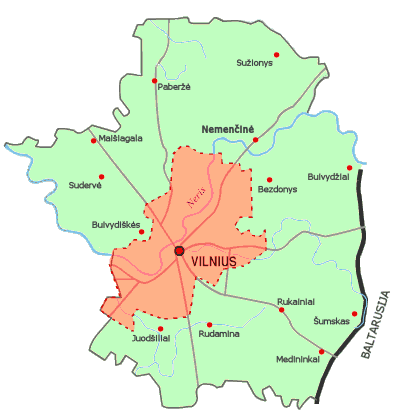
Map of Vilnius district

Vilnius District Municipality (Lithuanian: Vilniaus rajono savivaldybė), one of the country's largest municipalities, covers 2,129 square kilometres (822 sq mi) and has 23 elderships. There are over 1,000 villages and five towns (Nemenčinė, Bezdonys, Maišiagala, Mickūnai and Šumskas) in the district. It borders Belarus and the Švenčionys, Moletai, Širvintos, Elektrėnai, Trakai and Šalčininkai districts.

The district has a multinational population, of which 52 percent are Poles, 33 percent Lithuanians, and the remainder Russians, Belarusians and other nationalities (including Ukrainians). It has a population of over 100,000; 95 percent live in villages, and five percent live in towns. Vilnius district has Lithuania's highest terrain, with the Aukštojas, Juozapinė and Kruopinė Hills over 290 metres (950 ft) above sea level.

Palm Sunday is celebrated in the district, and Vilnian Easter palms (verbos) are made from dried flowers and herbs. Palm-making dates to the time of St. Casimir.

Medininkai Castle, the Liubavas Manor mill and Bareikiškės Manor are the district's best-known historic landmarks. From 1769 to 1795, Vilnius Voivodeship surrounded the independent Republic of Paulava. The microstate, known for its Enlightenment values, had its own president, peasant parliament, army and laws.

With its large Polish population, the Vilnius District Municipality Council primarily consists of members of the Electoral Action of Poles in Lithuania party. Its mayor is Robert Duchniewicz of the Lithuanian Social Democratic Union.

=== National government ===
Seimas Palace in Vilnius, where the parliamentarians of Lithuania convenes

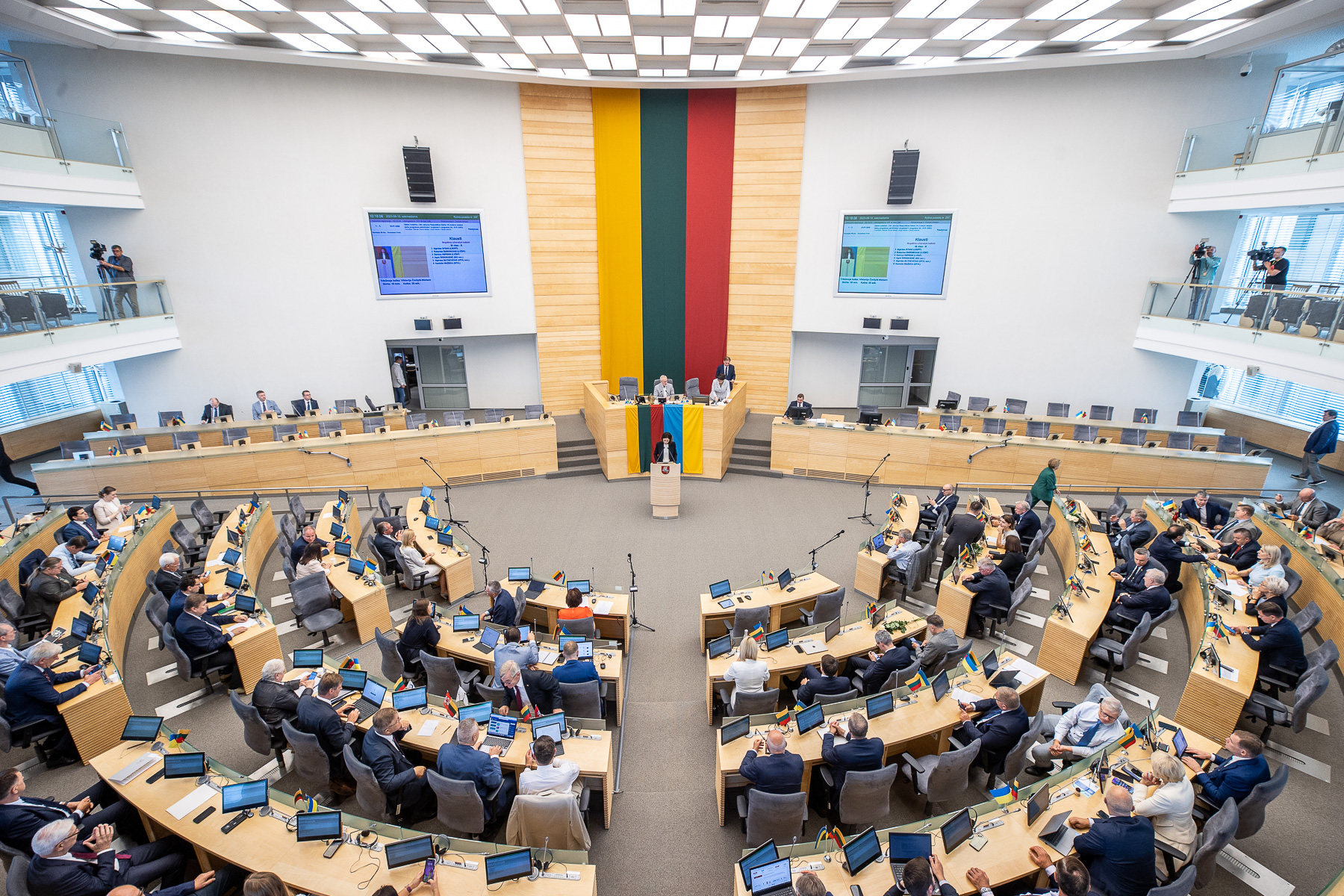
A Seimas plenary session

Vilnius is the seat of Lithuania's national government. The country's two chief officers have their offices in Vilnius. The president's seat is at the Presidential Palace at Daukanto Square, and the prime minister's seat is at the Government of Lithuania office on Gediminas Avenue. Both the president has a residence in Vilnius' Turniškės district near the Neris. The prime minister is also has entitled to a residence in Turniškės district during their term in office. Government ministries are located throughout the city, many in the Old Town.

The Seimas of the Grand Duchy of Lithuania primarily gathered in Vilnius. The present-day Seimas meets at the Seimas Palace on Gediminas Avenue.

Lithuania's highest courts are in Vilnius. The Supreme Court of Lithuania (Lithuanian: Lietuvos Aukščiausiasis Teismas), which reviews criminal and civil cases, is on Gynėjų Street. The Supreme Administrative Court of Lithuania (Lithuanian: Lietuvos vyriausiasis administracinis teismas), which adjudicates litigation against public bodies, is on Žygimantų Street. The Constitutional Court of Lithuania (Lithuanian: Lietuvos Respublikos Konstitucinis Teismas), an advisory body with authority over the constitutionality of laws, meets in the Constitutional Court Palace on Gediminas Avenue. The Lithuanian Tribunal, the highest appellate court for the nobility of the Grand Duchy of Lithuania and established by Stephen Báthory in 1581, was in Vilnius until the Third Partition of Poland in 1795.

=== Special services ===
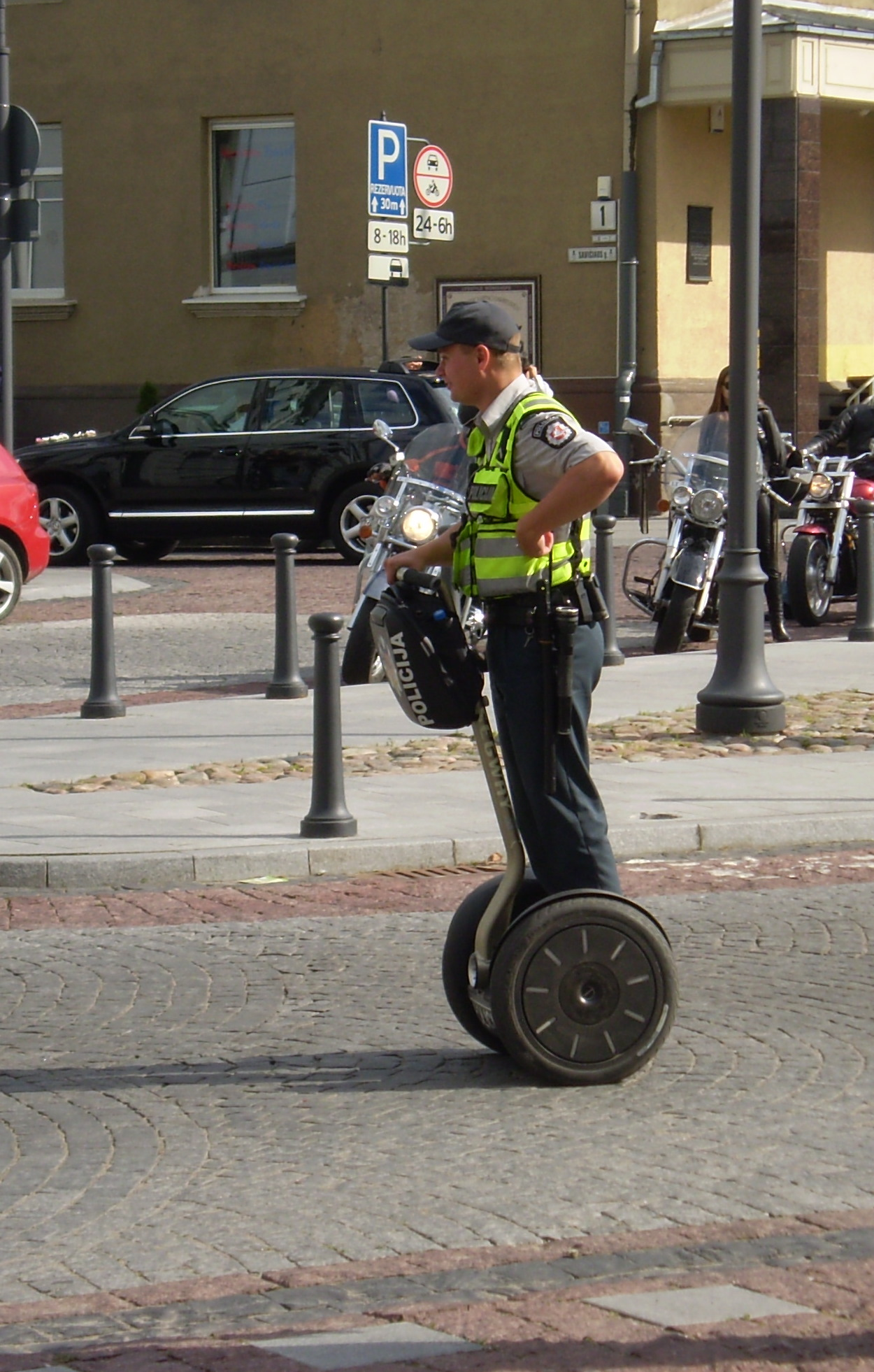
A police officer patrolling with a Segway

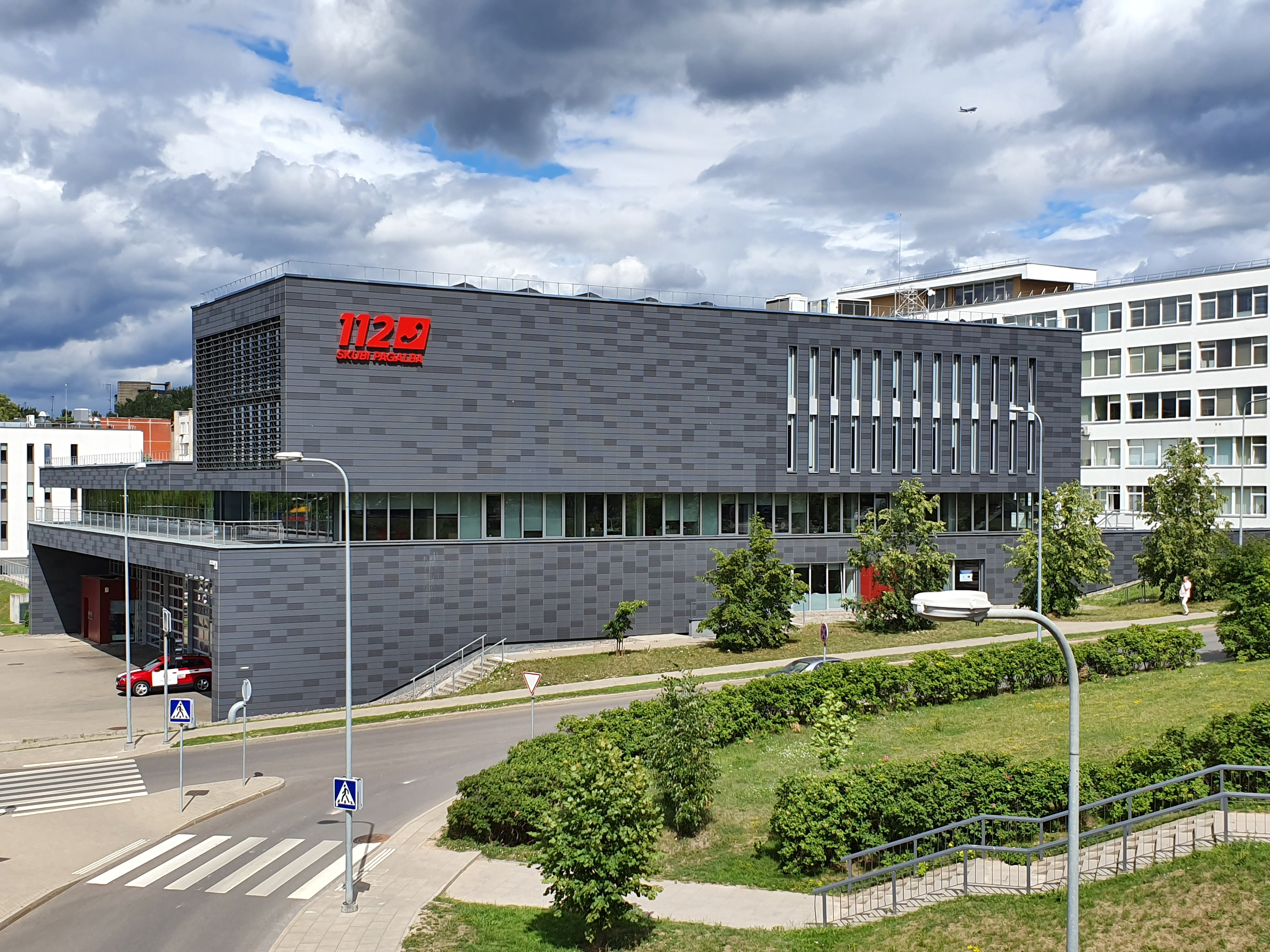
The Emergency Response Center in Antakalnis, which handles emergency calls in Vilnius

Security in Vilnius is primarily the responsibility of the Vilniaus apskrities vyriausiasis policijos komisariatas, the highest police office in the city, and local police offices. Its main responsibilities are ensuring public order and safety, reporting and investigating criminal offenses, and traffic control. In 2016, the city had 1,500 police officers. The Public Security Service is responsible for the prompt restoration of public order in special situations and ensuring the protection of important state objects and escorted subjects.

Vilniaus apskrities priešgaisrinė gelbėjimo valdyba is the primary governing body of Vilnius's firefighters. There were 1,287 fire incidents in the first nine months of 2018, killing six people and injuring 16.

Vilniaus greitosios medicinos pagalbos stotis is responsible for emergency medical services in the city, and the EMS telephone number is 113. Established in 1902, it is one of eastern Europe's oldest EMS institutions. Many doctors and other personnel received medals for their assistance to victims of the 1991 January Events. The common number for contacting emergency services in Vilnius and other parts of Lithuania is 112.

== Cityscape ==
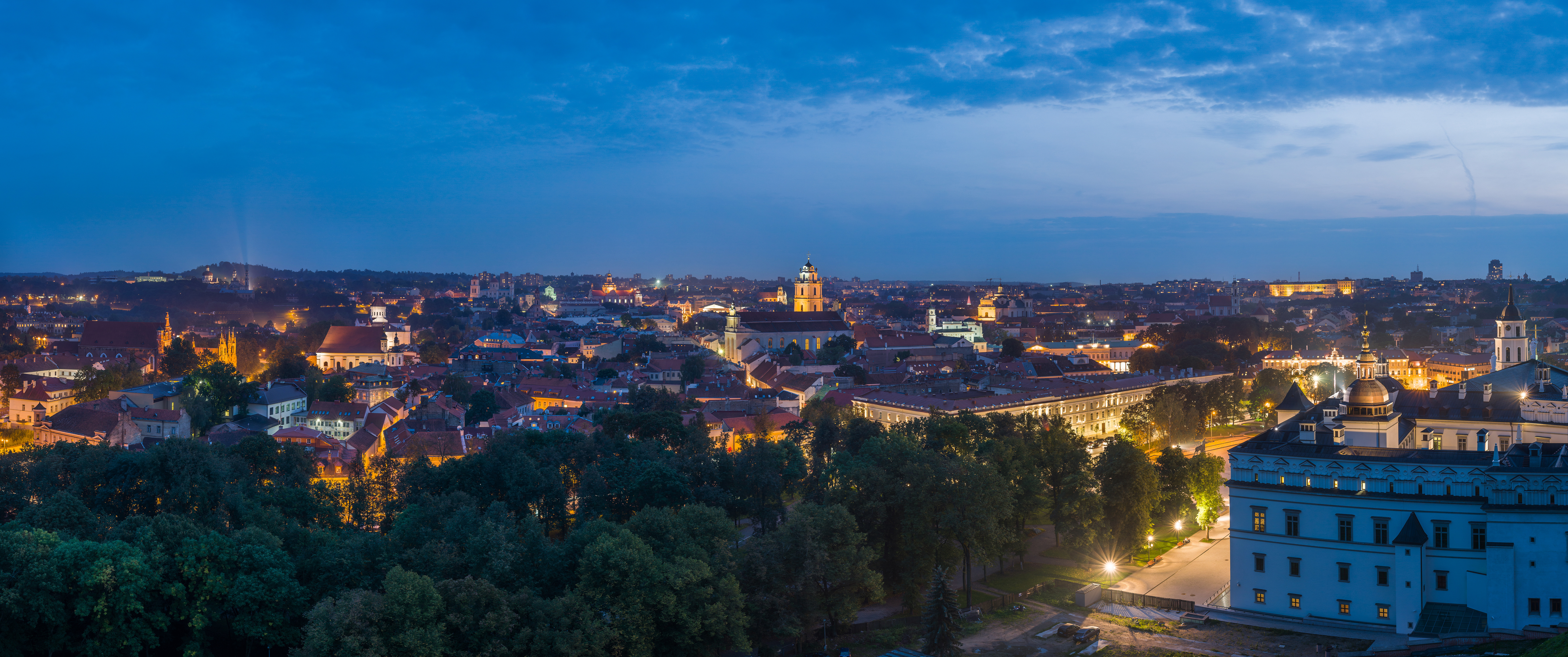
Panorama of Vilnius Old Town, seen from Gediminas' Tower at dusk. Vilnius has one of the largest and best-preserved old towns in northern, eastern, and central Europe. Its skyline is dominated by spires of churches dating to the Grand Duchy of Lithuania.

=== Urbanism and architecture ===
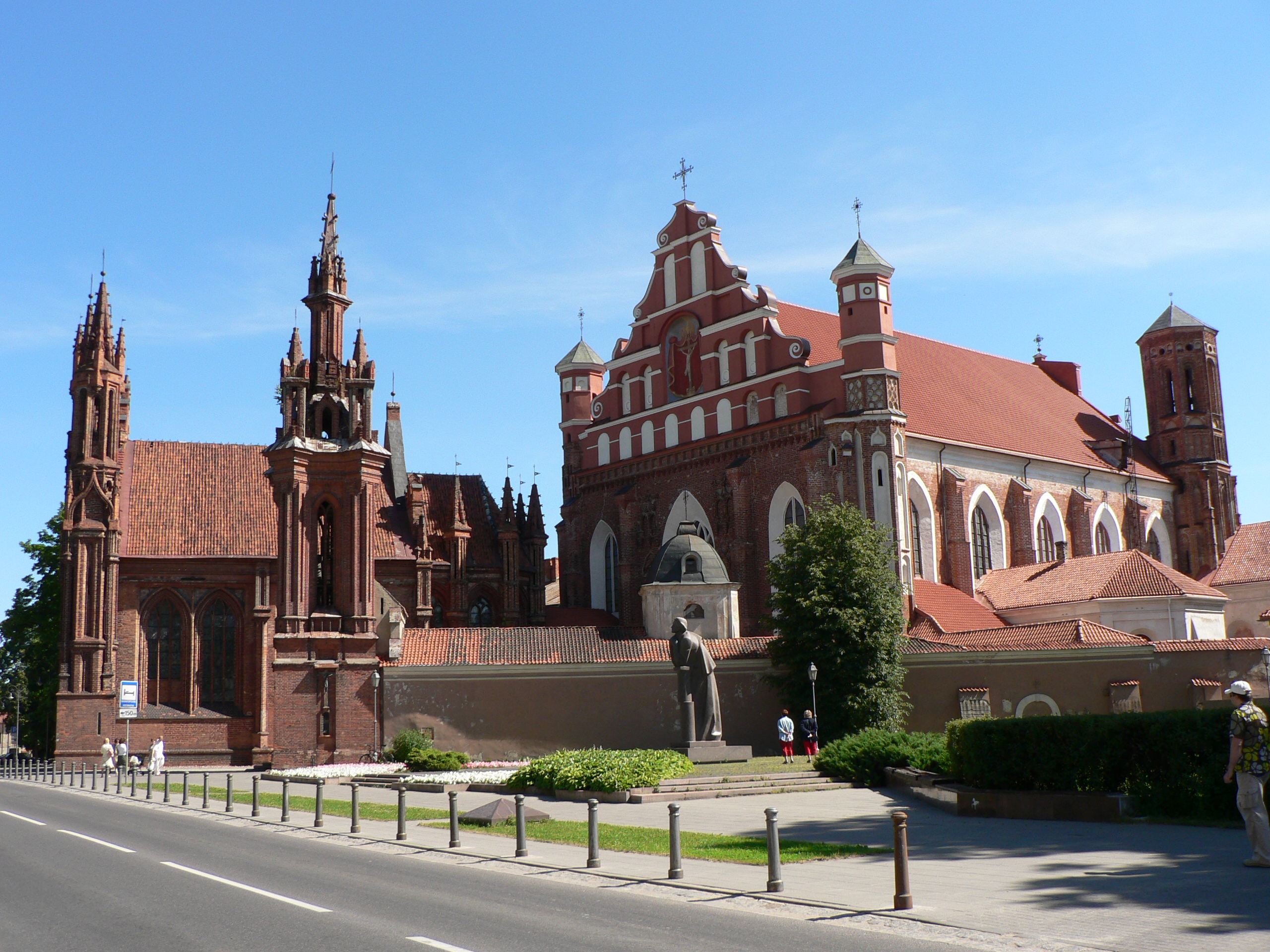
St. Anne's Church and the Church of St. Francis and St. Bernard are examples of Gothic architecture in Lithuania.

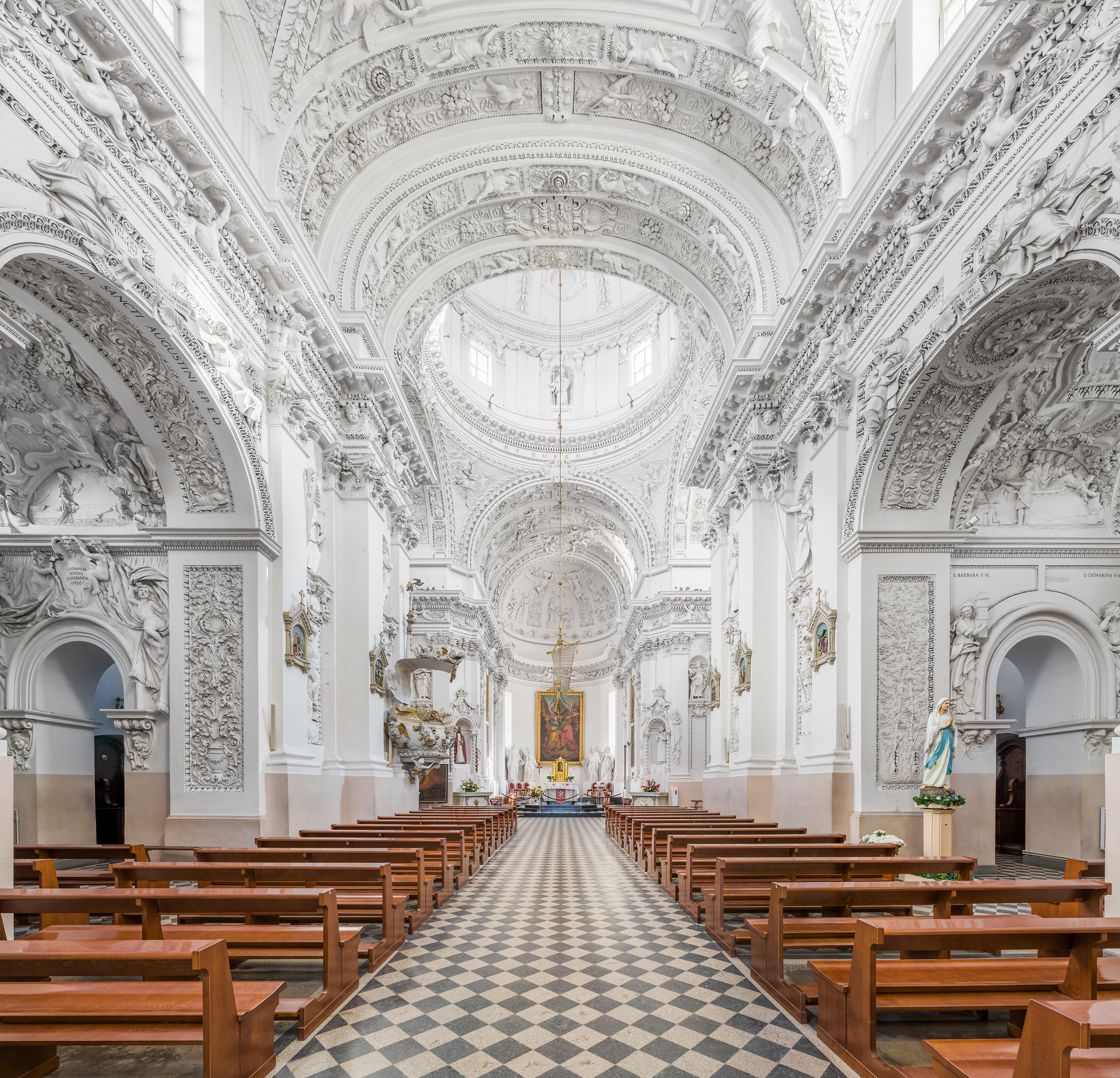
The Baroque Church of St. Peter and St. Paul was built by Michał Kazimierz Pac to commemorate victory over the Muscovites and their expulsion from Vilnius after six years of occupation.

The Old Town covers about 3.6 km^{2} (1.4 sq mi), and its history dates to the Neolithic. The glacial hills were intermittently occupied, and a wooden castle was built at the confluence of the Neris and Vilnia c. 1000 AD to fortify Gedimino Hill. The settlement developed into a town in the 13th century, when the pagan Baltic people were invaded by Western Europeans during the Lithuanian Crusade. Around 1323 (the first written sources about Vilnia), it was the capital of the Grand Duchy of Lithuania and had a few brick buildings. By the 15th century, the duchy extended from the Baltic to the Black Sea (primarily present-day Belarus, Ukraine and Russia). The historic centre consists of three castles (Upper, Lower and Curved) and the area previously encircled by the Wall of Vilnius. It is mainly circular, centered on the original castle site. Streets are small and narrow, with large squares later developed. Pilies Street, the main artery, links the Palace of the Grand Dukes of Lithuania with Vilnius Town Hall. Other streets are lined with the palaces of feudal lords and landlords, churches, shops and craftspeople's workrooms.

Historic buildings feature Gothic, Renaissance, Baroque and classical architecture. The variety of preserved churches and former palaces of the Lithuanian nobility exemplifies Vilnius's multicultural heritage.

Lithuanians and others shaped the development of the capital, with Western and Eastern influences. Lithuania was Christianized in 1387, but Eastern Orthodoxy and the growing importance of Judaism led to construction of the Orthodox Cathedral of the Theotokos and the Great Synagogue of Vilna).

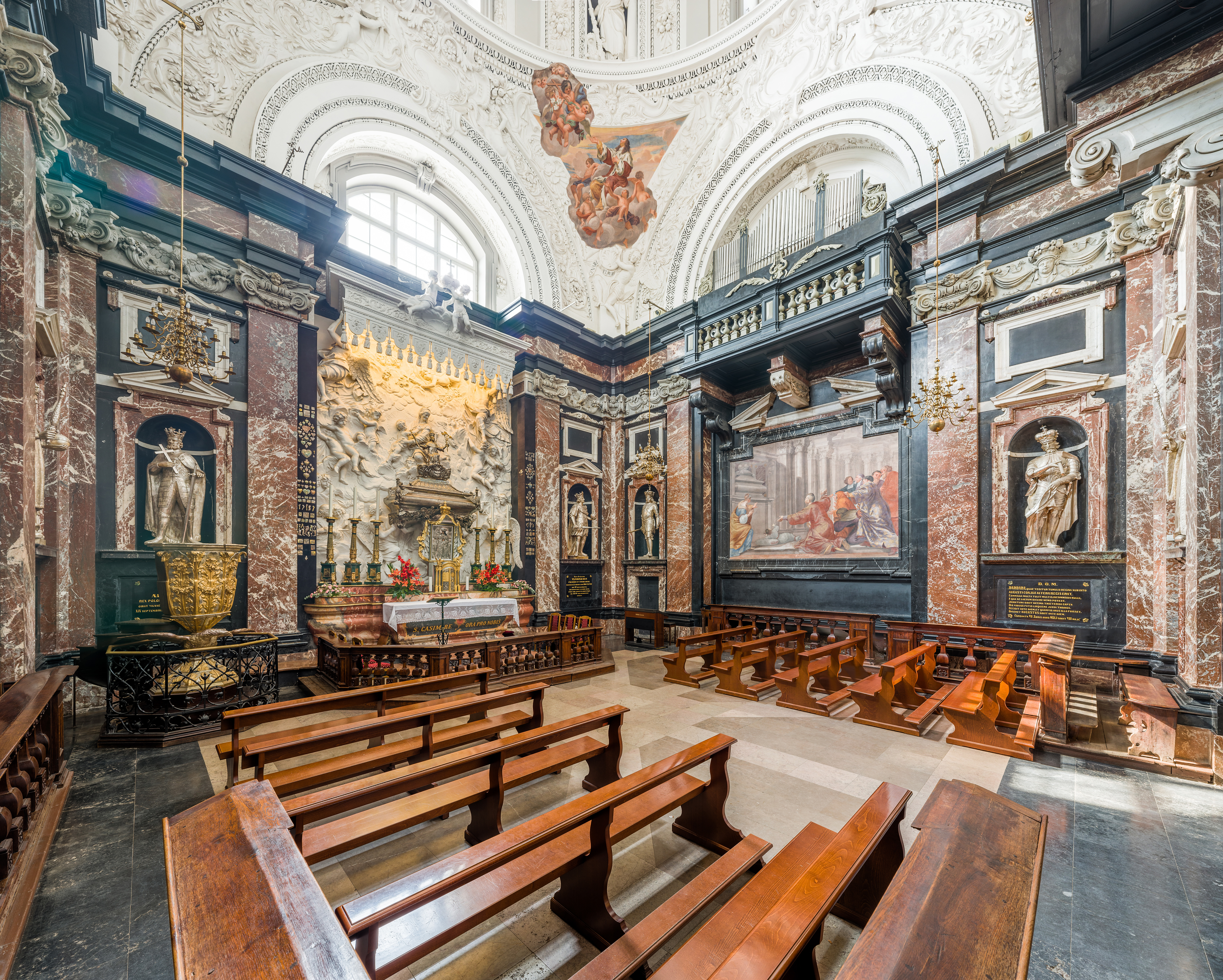
The 17th-century Chapel of Saint Casimir, the patron saint of Lithuania and its youth, in Vilnius Cathedral

Disasters resulted in buildings reconstructions in the Vilnian Baroque style, which later influenced the Grand Duchy of Lithuania. Italian artists such as Bernardinus Zanobi da Gianotti, Giovani Cini and Swiss–Italian artists such as Matteo Castelli, Pietro Perti, Costante Tencalla, Jacopo Tencalla from the present-day Canton of Ticino were preferred by the Grand Duke of Lithuania and local nobility, and designed, decorated the Palace of the Grand Dukes of Lithuania, Chapel of Saint Casimir, Sapieha Palace, Slushko Palace, Minor Radvilos Palace, etc. German descent architect Johann Christoph Glaubitz also extensively contributed to Baroque style reconstructions of buildings. Lithuanian Laurynas Gucevičius was a noted Neoclassical architect in the city.

The 352-hectare (870-acre) Old Town was designated as a UNESCO World Heritage Site in 1994. The Vilnius Historic Centre is noted for maintaining its medieval street pattern with no significant gaps. Some places were damaged during Lithuania's occupations and wars, including Cathedral Square (demolished in 1795) and a square east of the Church of All Saints where the Convent of the Barefoot Carmelites stood with Vice-Chancellor Stefan Pac's Baroque Church of St. Joseph the Betrothed (both demolished by the tsar. The Great Synagogue and part of the buildings in Vokiečių Street were demolished after World War II.

The Vilnius Central Business District in Šnipiškės neighborhood is developed since the 2000s as mostly high-rises central business district.

Vilnius covers 401 square kilometres (155 sq mi), of which one-fifth is developed; the remainder is greenspace and water. The city is known as one of Europe's "greenest" capital cities.

=== Crypts ===
Notable Lithuanian Catholics are interred in the crypts of Vilnius Cathedral. Grand Duke Alexander Jagiellon, Queen Elizabeth of Austria, Barbara Radziwiłł, and the heart of Grand Duke Władysław IV Vasa are buried at the Royal Mausoleum. These crypts have one of the country's oldest frescoes, painted in the late 14th or early 15th century after Lithuania was Christianized.

=== Housing ===
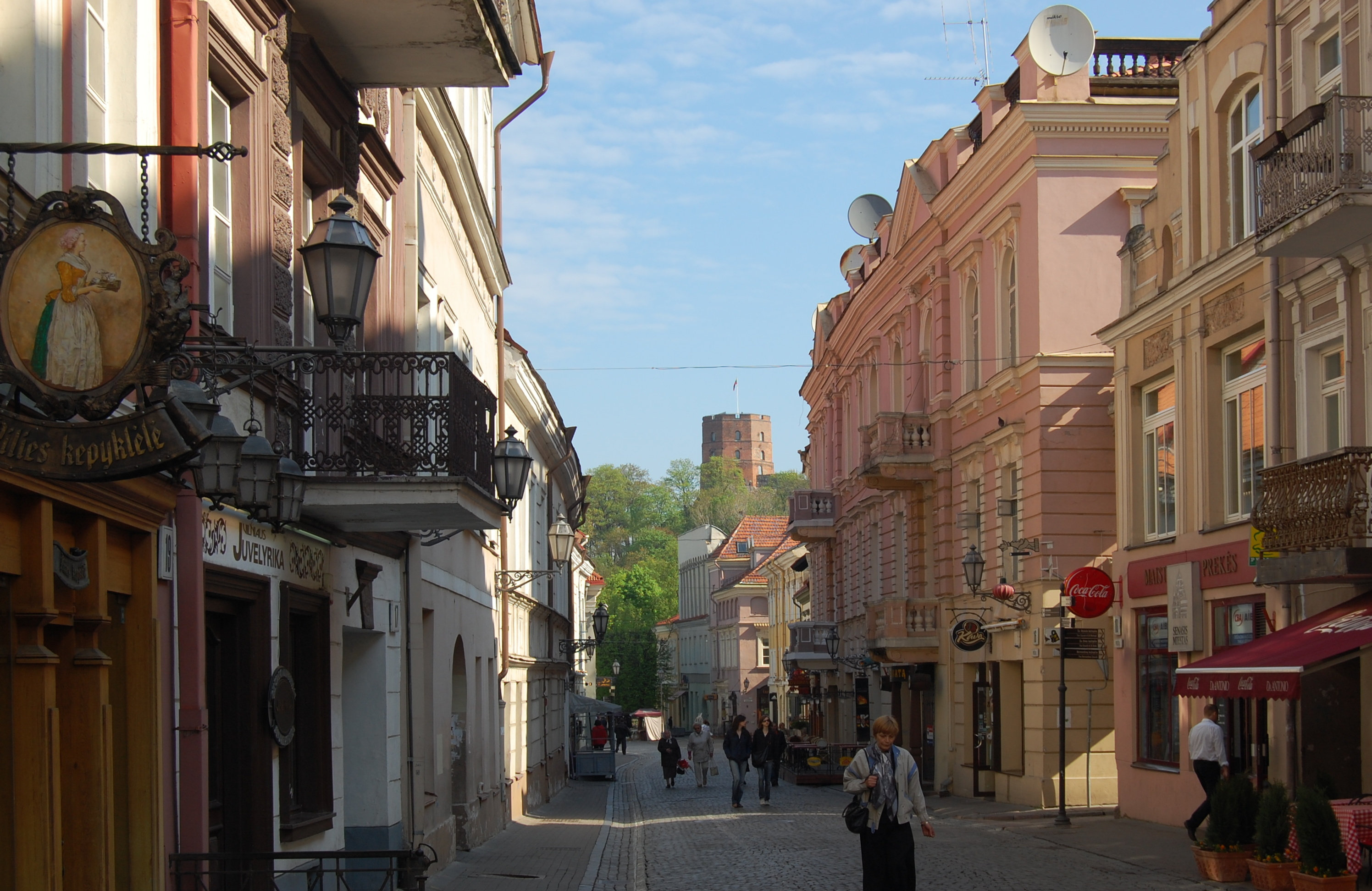
Pilies Street has a medieval atmosphere.

Vilnius Old Town (Lithuanian: Vilniaus senamiestis), with medieval stone-paved streets, and Užupis have prestigious housing, with apartments featuring views of iconic churches and urban landmarks (particularly Gediminas Tower), enclosed inner courtyards, high ceilings, attics, non-standard layouts and luxurious interiors; Flats in these neighbourhoods may cost millions of euros. Traffic jams, expensive parking, air pollution, high maintenance costs and limitations on renovation, however, also encourage wealthy Vilnians to buy or build private houses in outlying parts of the city such as Balsiai, Bajorai, Pavilnys, Kalnėnai and Pilaitė or the nearby Vilnius District Municipality. Around 21,000 residents live in the Old Town, and 7,000 in Užupis.

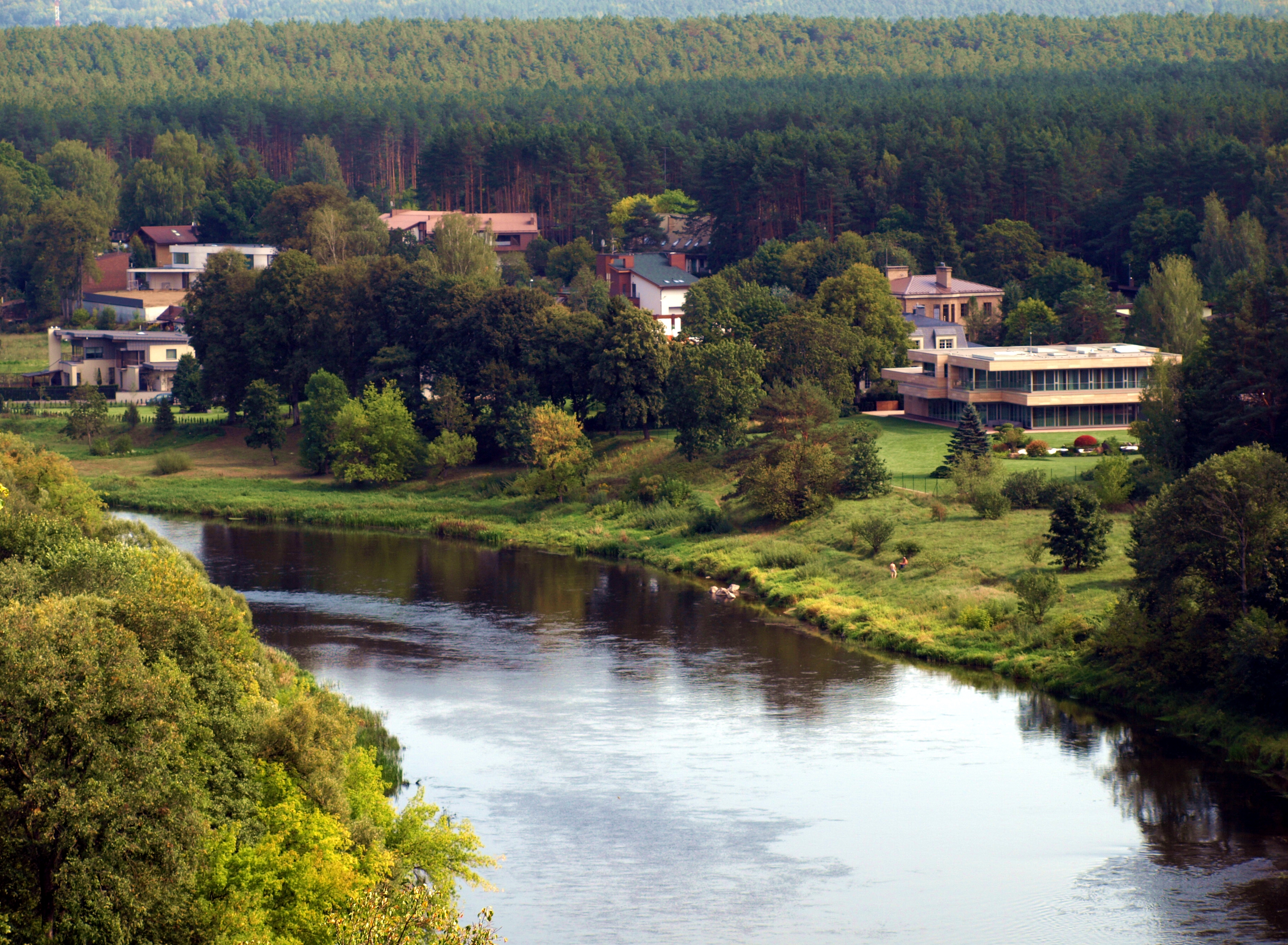
Part of the Valakampiai neighborhood in Antakalnis on the Neris, seen from Verkiai Palace

Helios City complex in Naujamiestis with shopping mall and apartments

Valakampiai and Turniškės are prestigious neighborhoods, with private houses on large lots surrounded by pine forests which are easily accessible from the city centre. Wealthy people and heads of state (such as the president) live there, and most of the larger private houses costs millions of euros. Part of the Žvėrynas neighbourhood has luxurious private houses near Vingis Park, but it also has Soviet-era apartment buildings and wooden houses in poor condition.

Neighbourhoods around the Old Town (Antakalnis, Žirmūnai, Naujamiestis, and Žvėrynas) have a variety of flats and green space, and are popular with middle-class residents. Wealthier people live in a new construction or renovated Soviet-era apartments. The government is supportive of renovation, and reimburses 30 percent or more of the cost. Poorer residents and low-income pensioners, however, foster regionalism.

More-distant neighbourhoods, such as Lazdynai, Karoliniškės, Viršuliškės, Šeškinė, Justiniškės, Pašilaičiai, Fabijoniškės and Naujininkai, have more-affordable housing. Their disadvantages are a longer commute, unrenovated Soviet-era high-rise buildings, traffic congestion and a shortage of parking spaces near older apartments.

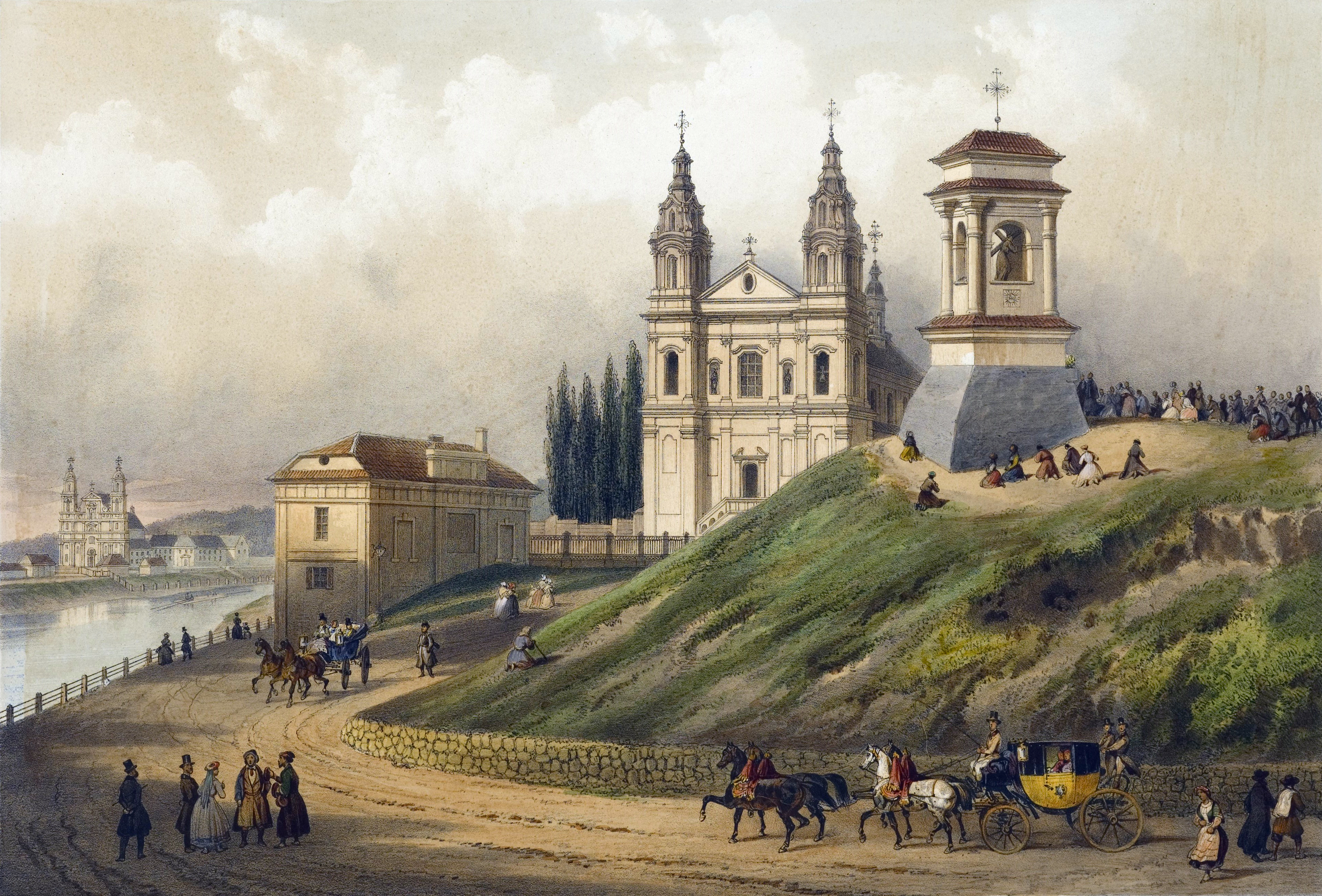
Mid-19th-century painting of the Chapel of Jesus of Šnipiškės

The Šnipiškės eldership has received significant investment during the 2010s. The area was first mentioned in 1536, when Grand Duke Sigismund I the Old ordered Ulrich Hosius to build a wooden bridge over the Neris and a suburb developed around the bridge. That century, a building for Muscovite and Tatar messengers was built by the magistrate of Vilnius north of Šnipiškės. The Jesuit Church of St. Raphael the Archangel and monastery and housing for wealthy and middle-class townspeople were built in Šnipiškės during the 18th century. Craftspeople lived on the outskirts, where a smoking-pipe factory, sawmills and a small candy factory were built. The 8-hectare (20-acre) Skansenas neighbourhood, west of the Kalvarijų market, has late-19th-century wooden houses. Nearby Piromontas was built at the same time.

During the 1960s, Šnipiškės was renamed the New City Centre. It had the city's first pedestrian zone and a number of buildings, including the country's largest shopping centre, a large hotel, a planetarium, a museum and a number of ministries of the Lithuanian SSR, were built before 1990. Šnipiškės north of Konstitucijos Avenue was underdeveloped until the early 2000s, when the new Vilnius city municipality building spurred construction of Europa Square with a shopping centre, a 33-story office building and a 27-story apartment building. The former Museum of the Revolution became the National Art Gallery in the late 2000s.

Modern housing in Paupys

According to economists, the number of transactions and the housing affordability index reached record highs in 2019 because of increased city-residents' income and slowing price increases for flats. One-fourth of residents 26 to 35 years old still live in homes owned by their parents or other relatives, however, the highest percentage in the Baltic states.

== Demographics ==
Vilnius population pyramid in 2021

In the eldership of Vilkpėdė, remnants of a Magdalenian settlement were found which date to c. 10,000 BC. Kairėnai, Pūčkoriai and Naujoji Vilnia had large settlements during the first millennium AD. The most densely populated area was the confluence of the Neris and Vilnia, which had fortified homesteads.

According to some historians, Vilnius could have been a city during the Kingdom of Lithuania times: King Mindaugas did not permanently live there, however, may have built Lithuania's first Catholic church for his coronation there. It is well established, however, that Vilnius existed as a city during the times of Traidenis and Vytenis. The first mention in the historical sources as a capital in 1323 in the letters to the Western cities of Gediminas.

It became a multicultural city, with 14th-century sources noting that it consisted of a Great (Lithuanian) city and a Ruthenian one. By the 16th century, German merchants, artisans, Jews and Tatars had also settled in Vilnius. During the 16th–17th centuries Reformation and Counter-Reformation, the city's Polish-speaking population began to grow; in the 15th–16th centuries only 5% of Vilnius townspeople acts were written in Polish, however by the middle of the 17th century most writing of townspeople acts was in Polish (53%). The city was inhabited by a large number of Italian and Swiss artisans as well and generally all the European nations were presented to an extent (those included Vilnius University professors and students among whom there were French, Spanish, Swedes and even some Croatians as Tomaš Zdelarius, musicians at the Palace of the Grand Dukes of Lithuania or such military servants as Hungarian Gáspár Bekes). Because of many nations inhabiting the city, in the 16th–18th centuries it was known and nicknamed in Western sources as Babylon of Europe. Nevertheless, even in the 19th century the Lithuanian population, despite the loss of statehood, still formed the largest ethnic group in the Vilnius Governorate, according to the estimates of Stanisław Plater (65% in 1825), Mikhail Lebedkin (49.98% in 1861), but per 1897 Russian census Lithuanian population decreased to only 17.6%. The 1916 German census estimated that the largest ethnic group living in the city of Vilnius in 1916 were Poles (50.2%; 70,629 of 140,840 residents).

By the inter-war period, after the brief Polish–Lithuanian War and the annexation of the so-called Republic of Central Lithuania by Poland, the population became overwhelmingly Polish with very significant Jewish minority – the 1931 Polish census recorded 65.9% Poles (128,628 residents) and only 0.8% Lithuanians (1,579 residents) in the city of Vilnius. However, the German census of 1 January 1941 provided significantly different estimates of the ethnic composition of residents of the city of Vilnius: Poles (41.89%; 87,855 residents), Lithuanians (24.37%; 51,111 residents). After World War II, the number of ethnic Lithuanians in Vilnius rebounded; however, Lithuanization was soon replaced with Sovietization, and the population became a mix of Lithuanians, Russians and Poles. Following independence in 1990, for the first time in modern history Lithuanians became a clear majority, increasing to 63.2 percent in 2011 and 67.4 percent in 2021.

=== Evolution ===
Demographic evolution of Vilnius between 1766 and 2024:

Historical population

Year	Pop.	±% p.a.
1766	60,000	—
1796¹	17,500	−4.02%
1800	25,400	+9.76%
1811	56,300	+7.50%
1818²	33,600	−7.11%
1822	43,900	+6.91%
1830	42,000	−0.55%
1834	52,400	+5.69%
1836	56,100	+3.47%
1839	54,700	−0.84%
1846	54,200	−0.13%
1852	65,400	+3.18%
1860	60,000	−1.07%
1870	64,200	+0.68%
1875	82,700	+5.19%
1885	102,900	+2.21%
1897	154,500	+3.44%
1909	205,200	+2.39%
1911	238,600	+7.83%
1916	140,800	−10.01%
1919³	128,500	−3.00%

Year	Pop.	±% p.a.
1923	167,400	+6.83%
1931	195,100	+1.93%
1939	209,400	+0.89%
1941⁴	270,000	+13.55%
1944⁵	110,000	−25.87%
1959	236,100	+5.22%
1970	372,100	+4.22%
1979	481,000	+2.89%
1985	544,400	+2.09%
1989	576,700	+1.45%
1990	597,000	+3.52%
1992	644,600	+3.91%
1995	578,327	−3.55%
1996	571,164	−1.24%
1997	565,881	−0.92%
1998	562,353	−0.62%
1999	558,816	−0.63%
2000	554,281	−0.81%
2001	550,924	−0.61%
2002	550,213	−0.13%
2003	548,729	−0.27%

Year	Pop.	±% p.a.
2004	546,773	−0.36%
2005	542,525	−0.78%
2006	541,732	−0.15%
2007	541,596	−0.03%
2008	542,969	+0.25%
2009	543,191	+0.04%
2010	536,127	−1.30%
2011	533,279	−0.53%
2012	537,152	+0.73%
2013	539,707	+0.48%
2014	542,626	+0.54%
2015	543,493	+0.16%
2016	545,280	+0.33%
2017	547,484	+0.40%
2018	552,131	+0.85%
2019	561,836	+1.76%
2020	569,729	+1.40%
2021	563,012	−1.18%
2022	576,195	+2.34%
2023	593,436	+2.99%
2024	602,430	+1.52%

Source: ¹ Sharp decline after the Vilnius uprising (1794); ² Decline of population due to Napoleonic wars and the aftermath; ³ Sharp decline of population of Vilnius because of World War I and the aftermath during the clashes around Vilnius. These resulted in evacuation of Russian military, bureaucracy and the majority of its Russian inhabitants from Vilnius in 1915, as well as fleeing or evacuation of other Vilnius inhabitants of various communities (mostly Jewish and Lithuanian) to Russia and rural parts of Lithuania; ⁴ Rise of population due to influx of Polish and Jewish war refugees and migration of Lithuanian bureaucracy, students from temporary capital Kaunas and other localities in Lithuania; ⁵ Sharp decline of population after atrocities of World War II and The Holocaust

== Economy ==
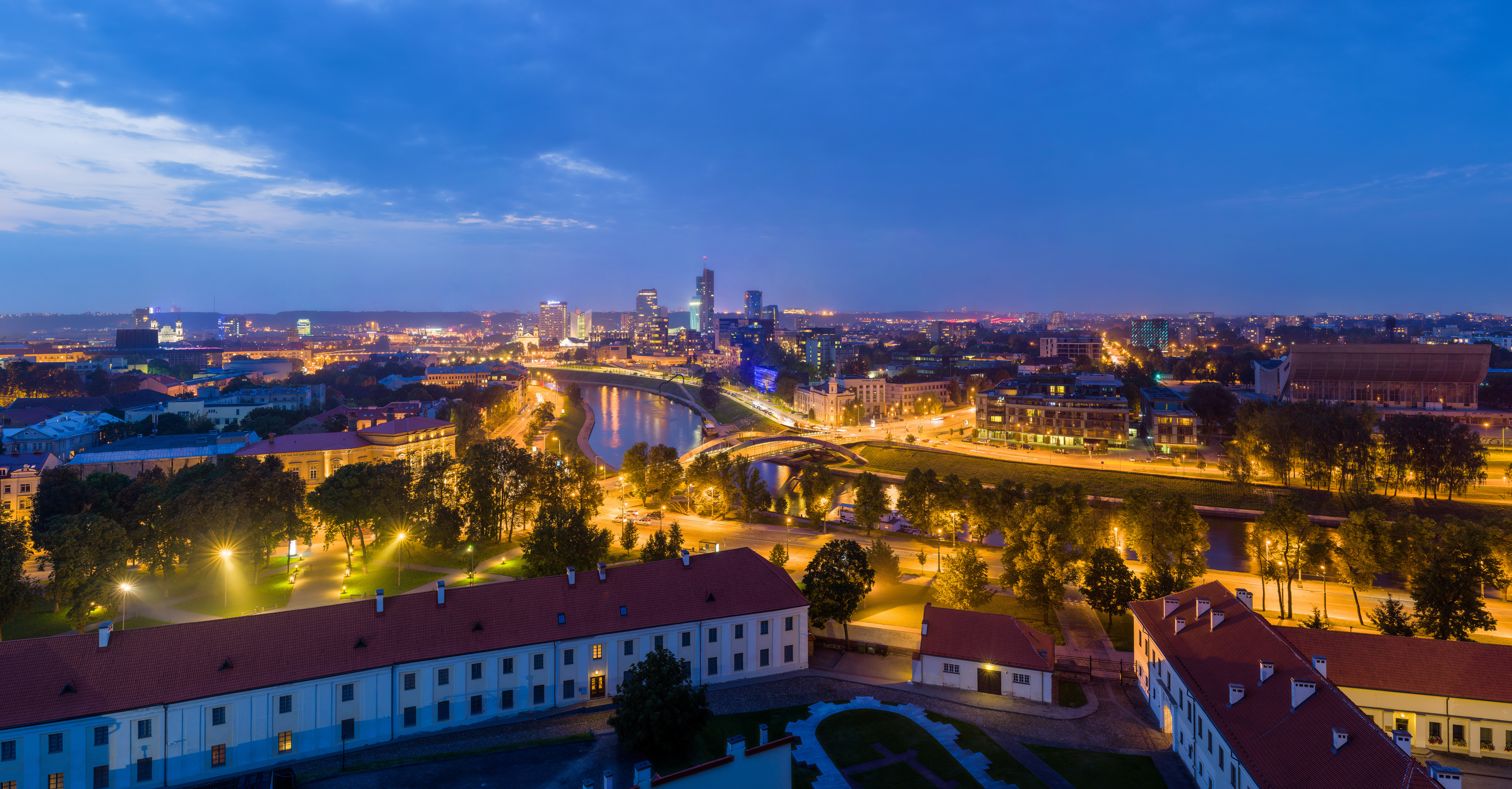
The skyline at dusk, with the Vilnius Central Business District housing banks, financial services and businesses headquarters

Europa Tower, the tallest building in the Baltics, is a symbol of modern Vilnius.

Vilnius is Lithuania's economic centre, with a per-capita GDP in the metropolitan area of over €40,000. The city's budget reached €1.0 billion in 2022. The average monthly salary in Vilnius is €2,891 (US$3,262.98) (gross) and €1,749 (US$1,974.04) (net).

The K29 business centre is the first office in the Baltic states to receive an excellent BREEAM rating.

Lithuania's economic growth has been uneven, with GDP per capita at nearly 110 percent of the EU average in Vilnius but from 42 to 77 percent in other regions. The country's convergence is fuelled by two regions (Vilnius and Kaunas County) which produce 42 and 20 percent of the national GDP, respectively. From 2014 to 2016, the Vilnius region grew by 4.6 percent.

The supply of new housing in Vilnius and its suburbs has reached post-recession highs, and the stock of unsold apartments in Lithuania's three largest cities has begun to increase since the beginning of 2017. Demand for housing is strong, fuelled by rising wages, benign financial conditions and positive expectations. In the first half of 2018, the number of monthly transactions was the highest since its 2007–2008 peak. Most foreign direct investment and productive public investment in Lithuania is concentrated on Vilnius and Kaunas. Vilnius Industrial Park, 18.5 kilometres from the city, is intended for commercial and industrial use.

=== Science and research ===
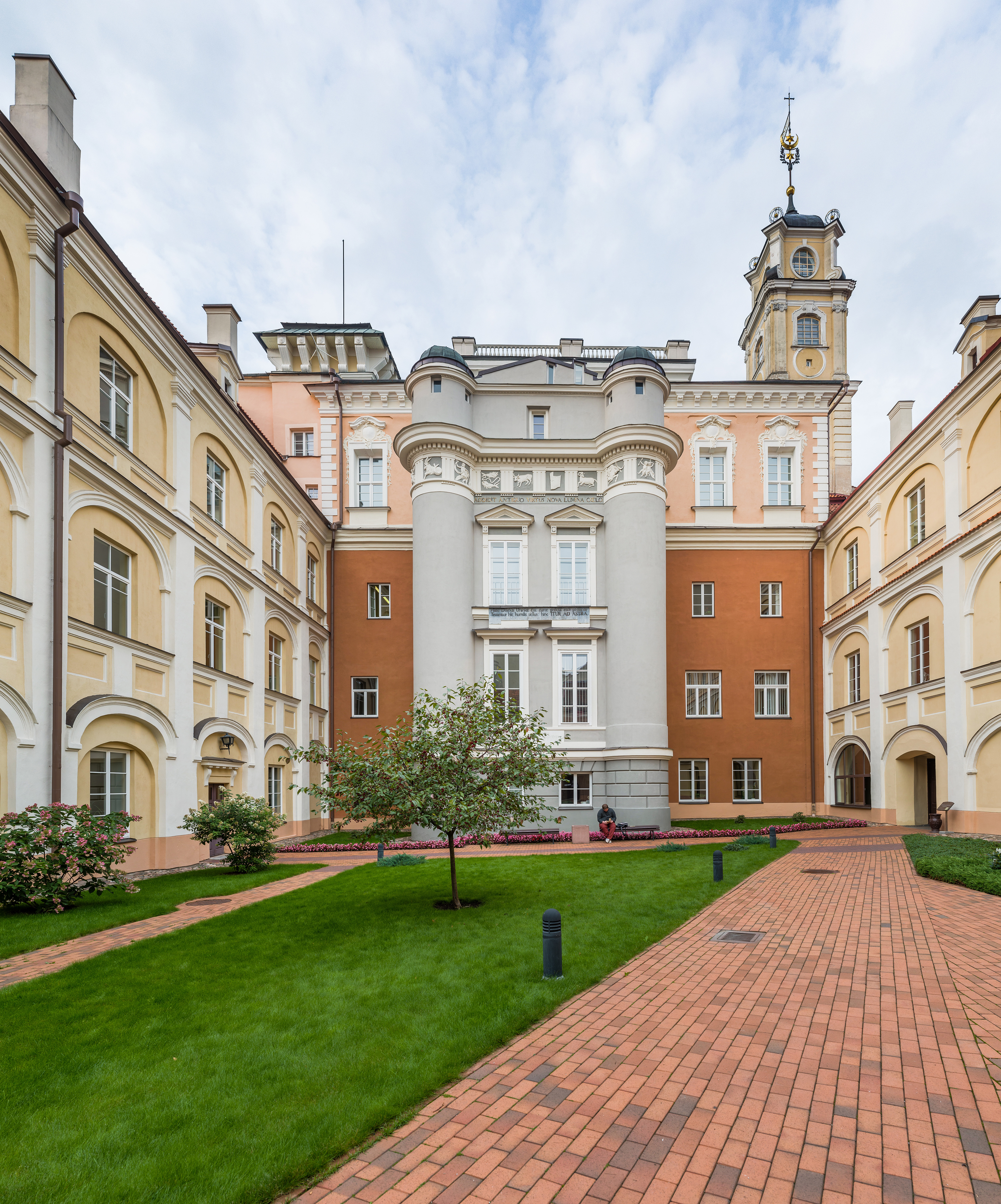
The Vilnius University Astronomical Observatory

Vilnius resident Tito Livio Burattini published Misura universale in 1675, in which he first suggested the term metre as a unit of length. The Vilnius University Astronomical Observatory, established in 1753 at the initiative of Thomas Zebrowski, was one of Europe's first observatories and the first in the Polish-Lithuanian Commonwealth. Marcin Odlanicki Poczobutt led the reconstruction of the observatory, designed by Marcin Knackfus, from 1770 to 1772. Poczobutt began his astronomical observations in 1773, recording them in the journal (French: Cahiers des observations), and created the constellation Taurus Poniatovii. Jean-Emmanuel Gilibert established the Botanical Garden of Vilnius University in 1781 with over 2,000 plants, and provided the first herbariums, collections of stuffed animals and birds, fossil plants, animal remains, and a collection of minerals to Vilnius University. The observatory published the Russian Empire's first exact sciences journal, the Journal of Mathematical Sciences (Russian: Вестник математических наук), after the Third Partition of Poland.

Scientific centres and university faculties at Sunrise Valley

Sunrise Valley Science and Technology Park (Lithuanian: Saulėtekio slėnio mokslo ir technologijų parkas) is a non-profit organization which was founded in 2003. Over 20,000 students study in the Vilnius University and Vilnius Gediminas Technical University facilities in Sunrise Valley, and 5,000 scientists conduct research in its science centres.

The Centre for Physical Sciences and Technology (Lithuanian: Fizinių ir technologijos mokslų centras, FTMC) is the country's largest scientific research institution, specialising in laser technology, optoelectronics, nuclear physics, organic chemistry, bio and nanotechnology, electrochemical materials science, and electronics. The centre was created in 2010 with the merger of the institutes of chemistry, physics and semiconductor physics in Vilnius and the Textile institute in Kaunas. With 250 laboratories (24 open to the public), it can accommodate over 700 researchers and students. The centre has a PhD program and hosts annual conferences of PhD students and young researchers. FTMC is the founder and sole shareholder of the Science and Technology Park of Institute of Physics in Savanorių Avenue, which assists companies with research and development.

Vilnius University's Laser Research Centre (Lithuanian: Vilniaus universiteto Lazerinių tyrimų centras) is one of five departments in the university's Faculty of Physics, which prepares physicists, laser physicists and laser-technology specialists. The department conducts research in laser physics, nonlinear optics, optical-component characterization, biophotonics and laser microtechnology. Lithuania has over 50 percent of the world's market share in ultrashort pulses lasers produced by Vilnius-based companies. A laser system was produced in 2019 for the Extreme Light Infrastructure laboratory in Szeged which produces high-intensity, ultra-short pulses with a peak power up to 1,000 times that of the most powerful nuclear power plant in the United States. Corning Inc. bought a glass-cutting licence from the Vilnius-based laser company Altechna and for manufacturing Gorilla Glass.

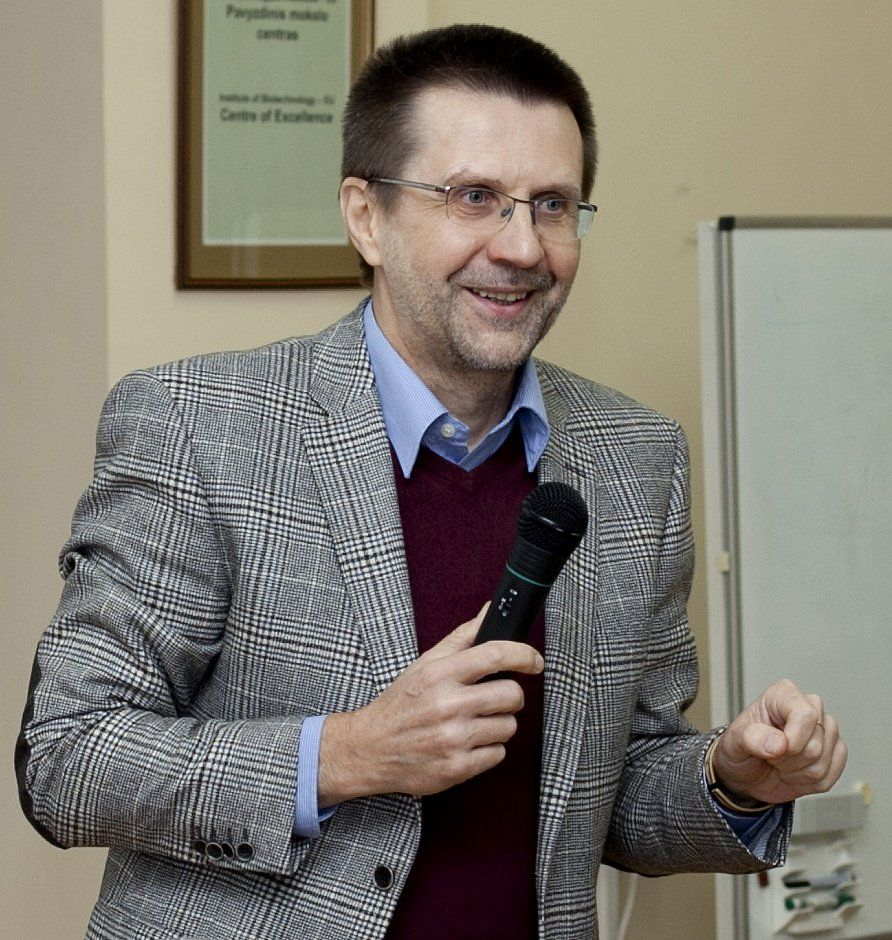
Virginijus Šikšnys is a biochemist at Vilnius University.

The Vilnius University Life Sciences Centre (Lithuanian: Vilniaus universiteto Gyvybės mokslų centras) is a scientific research centre which consists of three institutes: the Institute of Biochemistry, Institute of Biosciences, and Institute of Biotechnology. The centre was opened in 2016 and has 800 students, 120 PhD students, 200 teaching staff, and open-access scientific laboratories with advanced equipment. It has a technology business incubator for small and medium businesses in the life sciences or related fields. Vilnius Gediminas Technical University has three research centres at Sunrise Valley: the Civil Engineering Research Centre, Technology Centre for Building Information and Digital Modelling, and Competence Centre of Intermodal Transport and Logistics.

The Lithuanian Centre for Social Sciences (Lithuanian: Lietuvos socialinių mokslų centras), which cooperates with the Lithuanian government, produces and disseminates scientific information in the fields of economics, sociology and law to implement public policy. Santara Valley (Lithuanian: Santaros slėnis) is a science and research facility which focuses on medicine, biopharmaceutical and bioinformatics. The Vilnius University Faculty of Medicine Science Centre was scheduled for completion in Santara Valley in 2021.

Vilnius University rector Jonas Kubilius, known for probabilistic number theory, the Kubilius model, the Theorem of Kubilius and Turán–Kubilius inequality, successfully resisted attempts to Russify Vilnius University. Vilnius's Marija Gimbutas was the first to formulate the Kurgan hypothesis. In 1963, Vytautas Straižys and his colleagues created the Vilnius photometric system used in astronomy. Kavli Prize laureate Virginijus Šikšnys invented CRISPR-Cas9 genetic editing.

=== Information technology ===
The Green Hall business complex in Žvėrynas, which houses IT companies and Europe's first international Blockchain Centre

Vilnius is attractive for foreign companies because of its qualified employees and good infrastructure. Several schools are preparing skilled specialists, including the Vilnius University Faculty of Mathematics and Informatics and Vilnius Gediminas Technical University Faculty of Fundamental Sciences. Information technology jobs are well-paid. The 2018 output of the Lituanian IT sector was €2.296 billion, much of which was created in Vilnius.

Vilnius Tech Park in Sapieha Park, the largest IT startup hub in the Baltic and Nordic countries, unites international startups, technology companies, accelerators, and incubators. fDi Intelligence ranked Vilnius number one city on its 2019 Tech Start-up FDI Attraction Index.

Vilnius had the world's fastest internet speed in 2011 and, despite its fall in the rankings, remains one of the world's fastest. Vilnius Čiurlionis International Airport has one of Europe's fastest airport Wi-Fi speeds. The National Cyber Security Centre of Lithuania was established in Vilnius to address internet attacks on Lithuanian government organizations.

Lithuanian company Nord Security, famous for their virtual private network service NordVPN has also established their company and offices in Vilnius.

Bebras, an international informatics and IT contest, has been held annually for pupils in grades three through 12 since 2004. Since 2017, computer programming is taught in primary schools.

Vilnius is a popular fintech hub due to Lithuania's flexible e-money licence regulations. The Bank of Lithuania granted an e-money licence in 2018 to Vilnius-based Google Payment Lithuania. The startup Revolut also has an e-money licence and headquarters in Vilnius, and began moving its clients to the Lithuanian company Revolut Payments in 2019. On 23 January 2019, Europe's first international blockchain centre opened in Vilnius.

=== Finance and banking ===
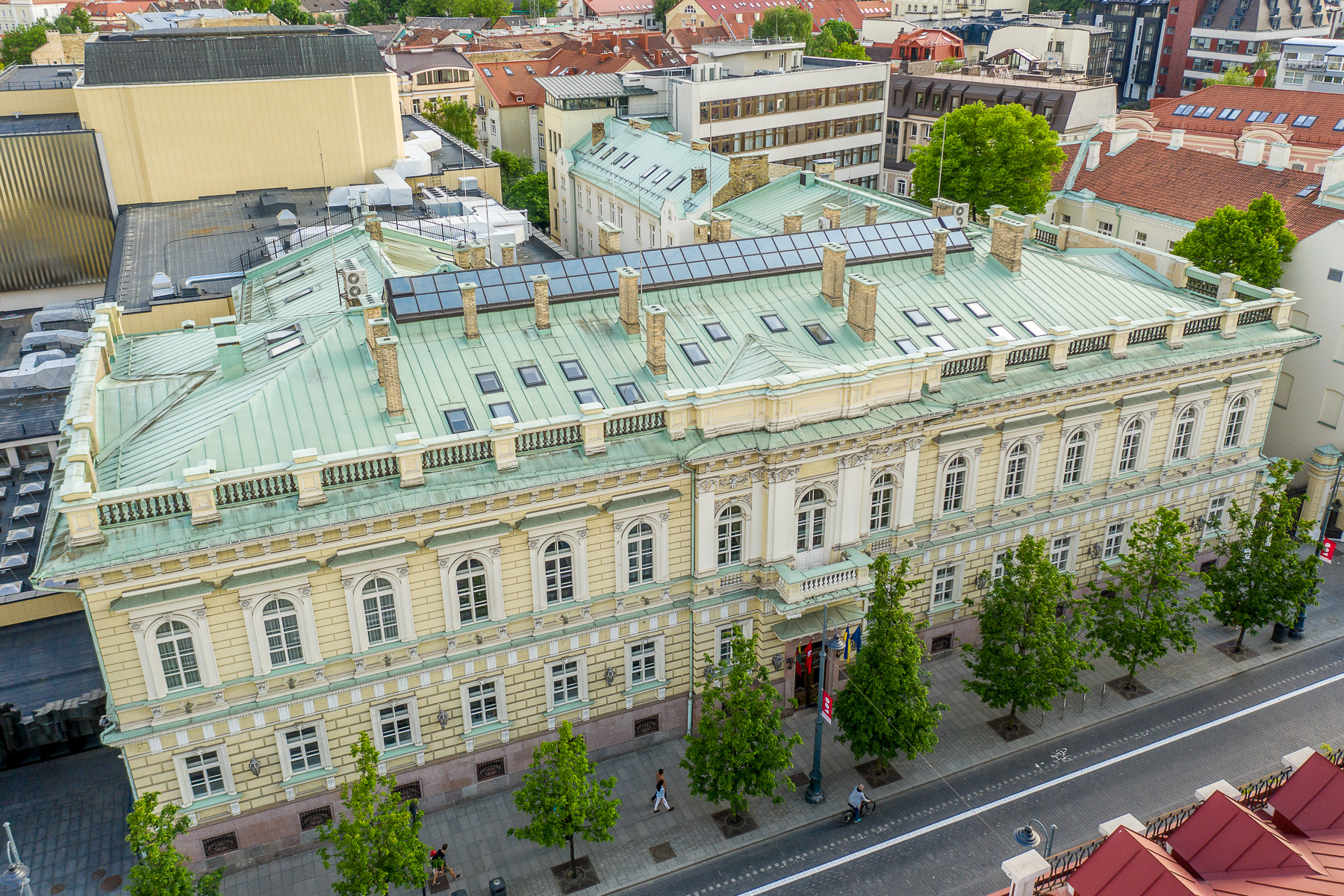
Bank of Lithuania headquarters in Gediminas Avenue

Vilnius is Lithuania's financial centre. The Ministry of Finance in Vilnius is responsible for an effective public financial policy to ensure the country's economic growth. The Bank of Lithuania fosters a reliable financial system and ensures sustainable economic growth. The Nasdaq Vilnius stock exchange is in the K29 business centre.

The National Audit Office of Lithuania (Lithuanian: Lietuvos Respublikos valstybės kontrolė) helps the government manage public funds and property, and the State Tax Inspectorate (Lithuanian: Valstybinė mokesčių inspekcija) is responsible for collecting and refunding taxes.

In 2023, 13 banks held a bank or specialised-bank licence; six banks are foreign-bank branches. Most of the Lithuanian financial system consists of capital banks of Nordic countries. The two largest banks registered in Lithuania (SEB bankas and Swedbank) are supervised by the European Central Bank and the Bank of Lithuania.

== Education ==
=== Primary and secondary education ===
The National M. K. Čiurlionis School of Art offers free education to talented students.

Primary and lower secondary education is mandatory in Lithuania. Children begin pre-primary education at age six, education is compulsory until age 16. Primary and secondary education is free, but there are also private schools in Vilnius. The country's educational system is governed by the Ministry of Education, Science and Sports, headquartered in Vilnius.

Cathedral School of Vilnius, first mentioned in a 1397 source, is the earliest known Lithuanian school. Vilnius Vytautas the Great Gymnasium, established in 1915, is the first Lithuanian gymnasium in eastern Lithuania. In 2018, the city had 120 schools (not including preschools) with 61,123 pupils and 4,955 teachers. Four out of five best rated schools in Lithuania are in Vilnius, and the Vilnius Lyceum is number one.

Ethnic minorities in Lithuania have their own schools. Vilnius has seven elementary schools, eight primary schools, two progymnasiums and 12 gymnasiums for minority children, with lessons in minority languages. In 2017, 4,658 Poles and 9,274 Russians studied in their languages in the city. Vilnius has 11 vocational schools.

The National M. K. Čiurlionis School of Art is the country's only 12-year art school. The Vilnius Justinas Vienožinskis Art School is another art school in Vilnius.

Most school graduates in Vilnius later study at universities or colleges. According to the OECD, 57.5 percent of 25– to 34-year-olds in Lithuania had a tertiary education in 2021. Vilnius has nine international schools, including the International School of Vilnius, Vilnius International French Lyceum, British International School of Vilnius, and American International School of Vilnius.

=== Tertiary education ===
The Great Courtyard of Vilnius University and the Church of St. Johns

On 14 October 1773, the Commission of National Education (Lithuanian: Edukacinė komisija) was created by the Sejm of the Polish–Lithuanian Commonwealth and Grand Duke Stanisław August Poniatowski, who supervised schools and Vilnius University in the Commonwealth. Because of its authority and autonomy, it is considered Europe's first ministry of education and an example of the Enlightenment in the Commonwealth.

Vilnius has a number of universities, the largest and oldest of which is Vilnius University. With its main campus in the Old Town, it has been ranked among the top 500 universities in the world by QS World University Rankings. The university participates in projects with UNESCO and NATO. It has master's programs in English and Russian, and programs in cooperation with other universities throughout Europe. The university has 14 faculties.

Other universities include Mykolas Romeris University, Vilnius Gediminas Technical University and the Lithuanian University of Educational Sciences, which merged with Vytautas Magnus University in 2018. Specialized tertiary schools with university status include the General Jonas Žemaitis Military Academy of Lithuania, the Lithuanian Academy of Music and Theatre, and the Vilnius Academy of Arts. The museum associated with the Vilnius Academy of Arts contains about 12,000 artworks.

=== Libraries ===
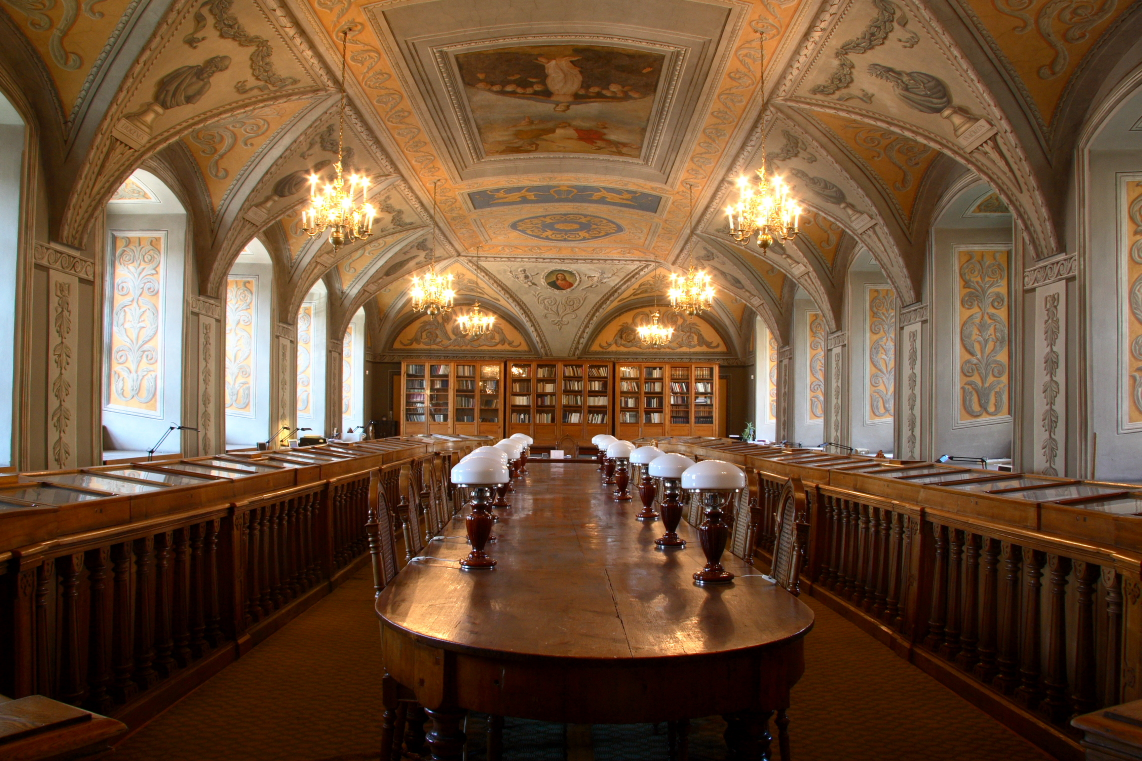
A 16th-century central Vilnius University Library reading room, decorated in 1803 with portraits of the 12 most prominent figures in antiquity, art and science

The Vilnius city municipality central library (Lithuanian: Vilniaus miesto savivaldybės centrinė biblioteka) operates public libraries in the city. It has 16 branches, one (Saulutė) dedicated to children's literature. Many libraries offer free computer literacy courses. The public libraries require a free LIBIS (integrated information system of Lithuanian libraries) card.

The Martynas Mažvydas National Library of Lithuania (Lithuanian: Lietuvos nacionalinė Martyno Mažvydo biblioteka) in Gediminas Avenue, founded in 1919, collects, organizes and preserves Lithuania's written cultural heritage, collects Lithuanian and foreign documents relevant to research and Lithuania's educational and cultural needs, and provides library services to the public. By 1 January 2025, the library had 6,425,401 physical units of documents.

The Wroblewski Library of the Lithuanian Academy of Sciences (Lithuanian: Lietuvos mokslų akademijos Vrublevskių biblioteka) is open to all. The library had 3,683,670 physical units of documents by 1 January 2025, and 9,491 registered users.

Every Lithuanian university and college has a library for students, professors and alumni. The National Open Access Scientific Communication and Information Center of Vilnius University (Lithuanian: Vilniaus universiteto bibliotekos Mokslinės komunikacijos ir informacijos centras) in Saulėtekis Valley opened in 2013 and has over 800 workplaces in an area of 14,043.61 m^{2} (151,164.2 sq ft). Central Vilnius University Library, Vilnius Gediminas Technical University Library, Mykolas Romeris University Library, ISM University of Management and Economics Library, European Humanities University Library, and Kazimieras Simonavičius University Library are on their respective campuses in Vilnius.

== Religion ==
Religious groups in Vilnius (2011 census)
Religion	People	%
Roman Catholic	350,797	65.5%
Eastern Orthodox	47,827	8.9%
Old Believers	5,593	1.0%
Evangelical Lutheran	1,594	0.3%
Evangelical Reformed	1,186	0.2%
Sunni Muslim	798	0.2%
Jewish	796	0.2%
Greek Catholic	167	<0.1%
Karaites	139	<0.1%
Other	5,050	0.9%
None	47,655	8.9%
No response	74,029	13.8%

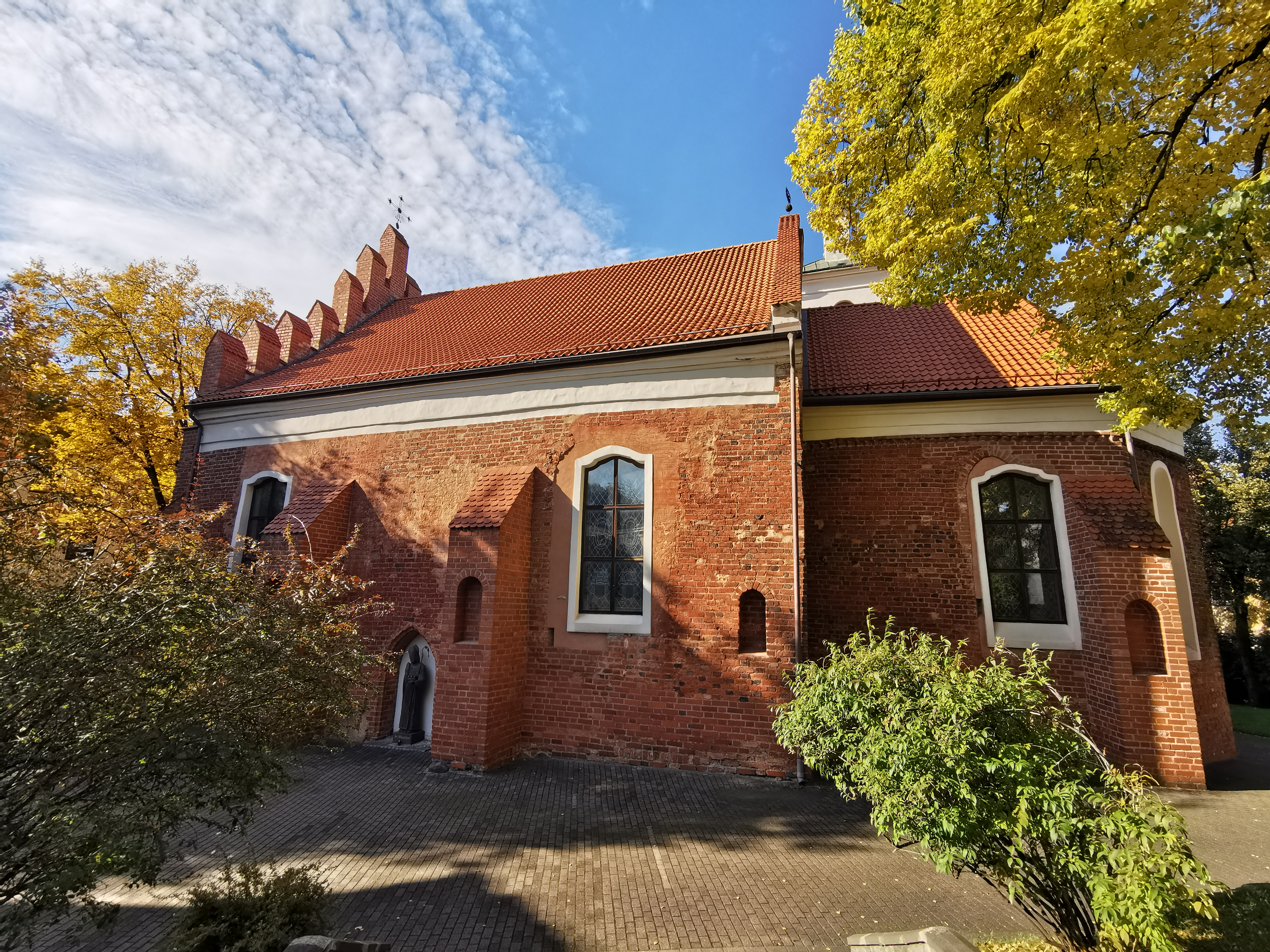
Vilnius's Church of Saint Nicholas, built before 1387, is Lithuania's oldest surviving Catholic church.

Lithuania's pre-Christian religion, centred on the forces of nature and personified by deities such as Perkūnas (the thunder god), is experiencing increased interest. Romuva established a Vilnius branch in 1991.

By the 17th century, Vilnius was known as a city of numerous religions. In 1600, Samuel Lewkenor's book about cities with universities was published in London; According to Lewkenor, Vilnius's population included Catholics, Orthodox, followers of John Calvin and Martin Luther, Jews and Tartar Muslims.

During that century, Vilnius had a reputation as a city unrivaled in Europe for its number and variety of churches. Robert Morden wrote in Geography Rectified or a Description of the World that no other city in the world could surpass Vilnius in the number of churches and temples except, perhaps, Amsterdam.

Vilnius is the seat of the Roman Catholic Archdiocese of Vilnius, housing major church institutions and the archdiocesan Vilnius Cathedral. A number of Christian beatified people, martyrs, servants of God and saints are associated with the city. They include the Franciscan martyrs of Vilnius, the Orthodox martyrs Anthony, John, and Eustathius, Saint Casimir, Josaphat Kuntsevych, Andrew Bobola, Raphael Kalinowski, Faustina Kowalska, and Jurgis Matulaitis-Matulevičius. There are a number of Roman Catholic churches in the city, small monasteries, and religious schools. Church architecture includes Gothic, Renaissance, Baroque and neoclassical styles, with examples of each in the Old Town. Eastern Rite Catholicism has also had a presence in Vilnius since the Union of Brest. The Baroque Basilian Gate is part of an Eastern Rite monastery.

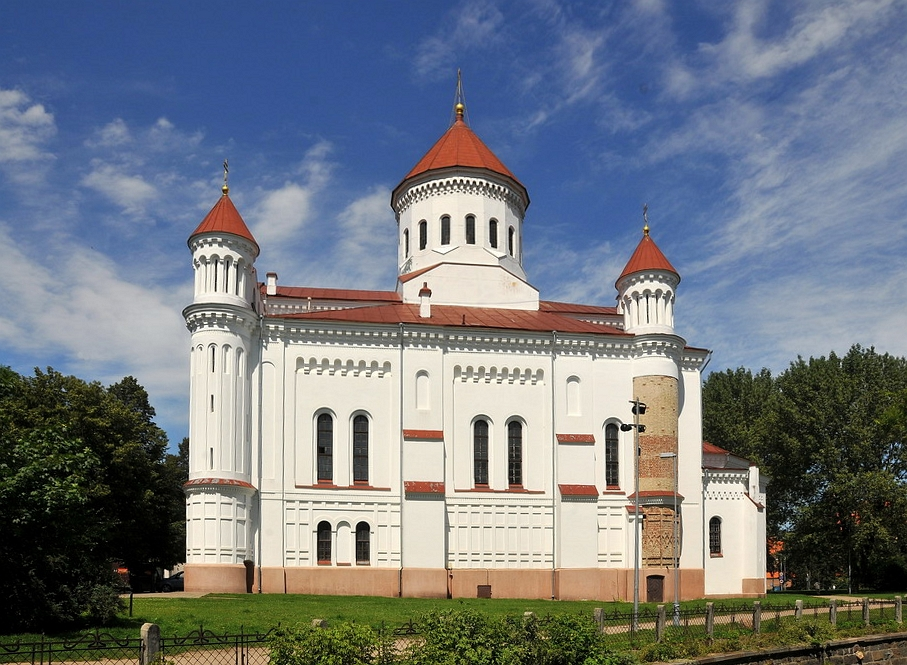
The Orthodox Cathedral of the Theotokos, built in the 14th century by Grand Duke Algirdas for Ruthenians in the city's Ruthenian quarter

Vilnius has had an Eastern Orthodox presence since the 12th century, and the Russian Orthodox Monastery of the Holy Spirit is near the Gate of Dawn. St. Paraskeva's Orthodox Church in the Old Town was the site of the 1705 baptism of Hannibal, the great-grandfather of Alexander Pushkin, by Tsar Peter the Great. Many Old Believers, who split from the Russian Orthodox Church in 1667, settled in Lithuania; a Supreme Council of Old Believers is based in Vilnius. The Orthodox Church of St. Constantine and St. Michael was built in 1913. A number of Protestant and other Christian denominations are represented in Vilnius, notably Lutheran Evangelicals and Baptists.

=== Judaism and Karaism ===
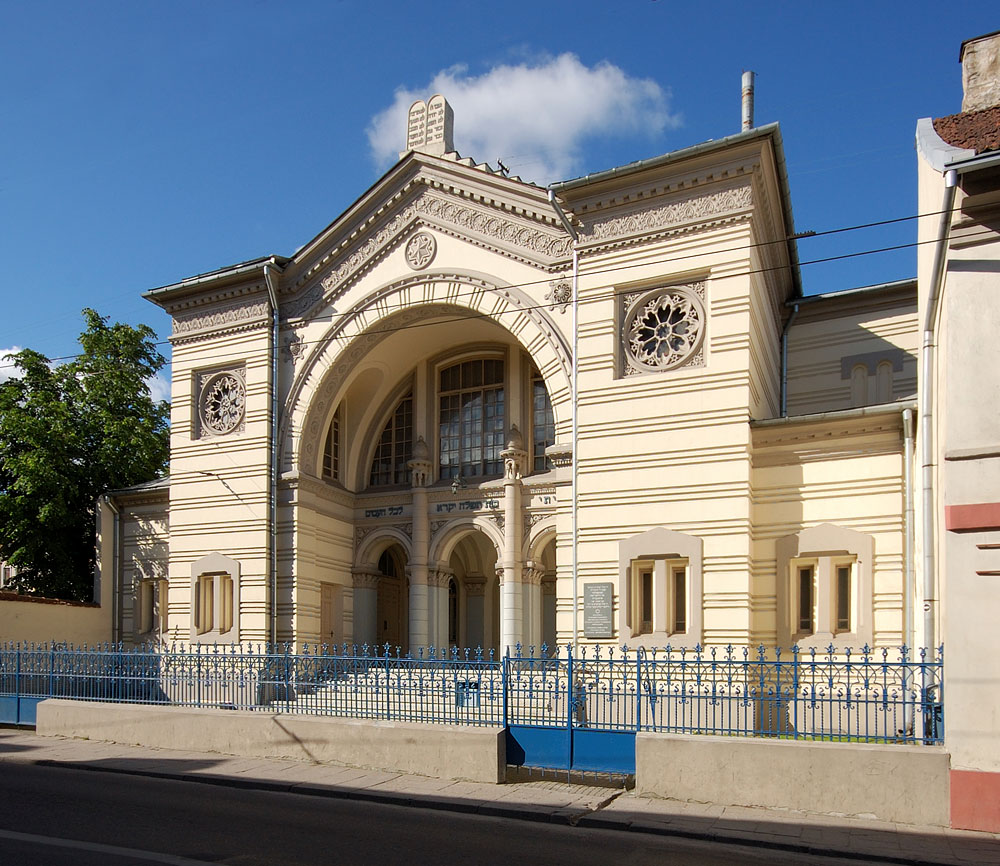
The Choral Synagogue

Known as "Yerushalayim D'Lita" (the Jerusalem of Lithuania), Vilnius had been a world centre for Torah study and had a large Jewish population since the 18th century. A major scholar of Judaism and the Kabbalah was Rabbi Eliyahu Kremer, known as the Vilna Gaon, whose writings significantly influence Orthodox Jews. The Vilna Shas, the most widely used version of the Talmud, was published in the city in 1886. Jewish life in Vilnius was destroyed during the Holocaust, and a memorial stone dedicated to victims of Nazi genocide is in the centre of the former Jewish Ghetto on present-day Mėsinių Street. The Vilna Gaon Museum of Jewish History is dedicated to the history of Lithuanian Jewish life. The site of Vilnius's largest synagogue, built in the early 1630s, destroyed by Nazi Germany during its occupation of Lithuania and later demolished by Soviet authorities, was found by ground-penetrating radar in June 2015. Archaeologists began excavating the site in 2016, and that work continues as of July 2024.

The Karaites are a Jewish sect who migrated to Lithuania from the Crimea. Small in numbers, they have become more prominent since Lithuanian independence and have restored their kenesas (including the Vilnius Kenesa).

=== Pilgrimage sites ===
It is safe to say that I have been in Vilnius all my life, at least since I became conscious. I was in Vilnius with thoughts and heart – one could say [my] whole being. And so it stayed – and in Rome.

— Pope John Paul II at the Dominican Church of the Holy Spirit during his 1993 visit to Lithuania

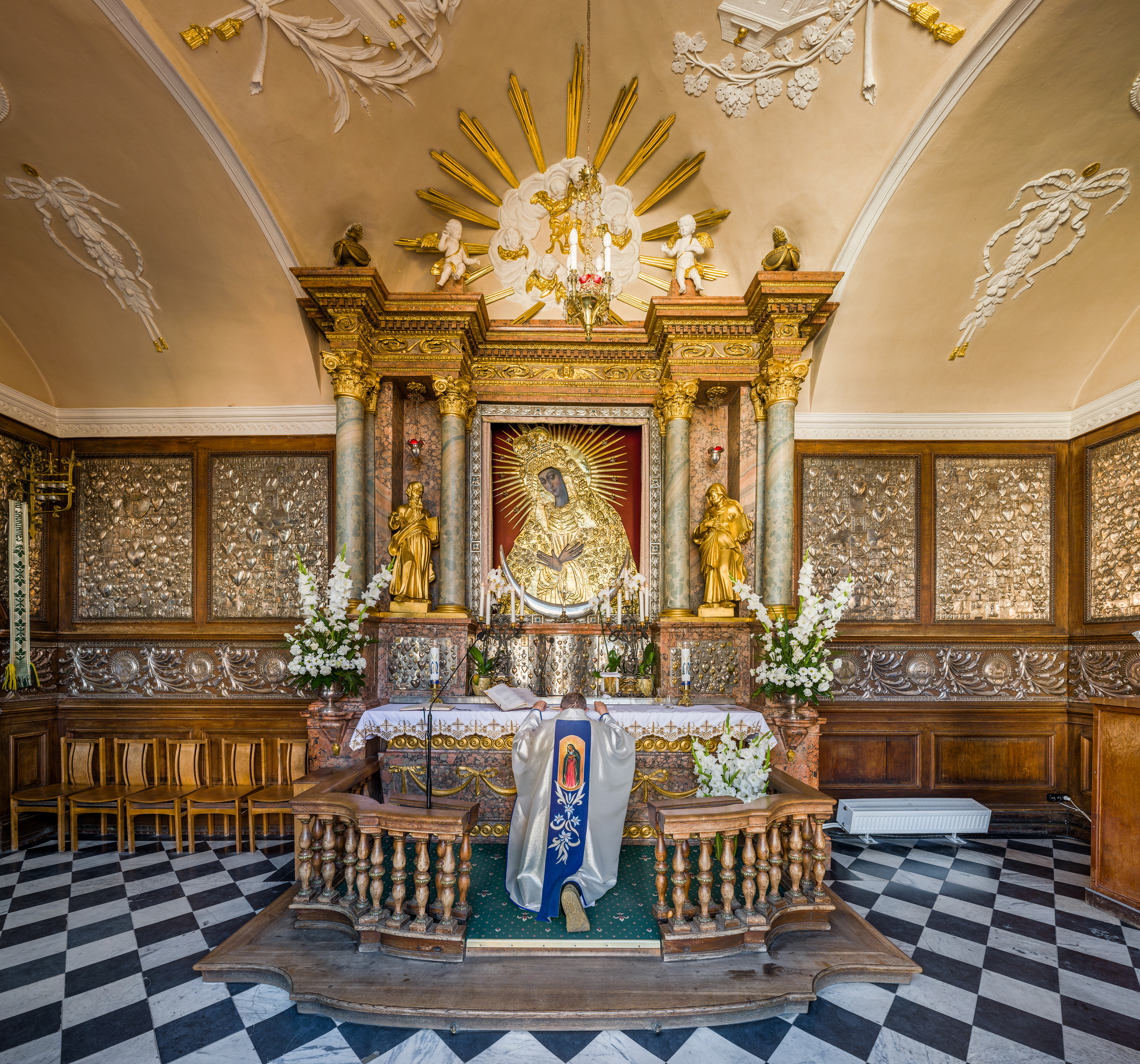
Interior of the Chapel of the Gate of Dawn, with its eponymous painting

Since the 1387 Christianization of Lithuania, Vilnius has become a centre of Christianity in the country and a pilgrimage site. The Vilnius Pilgrimage Centre (Lithuanian: Vilniaus piligrimų centras) coordinates pilgrimages, assists with their preparation, and performs pilgrimage pastoral care. A number of places in Vilnius are associated with miracles or mark events significant to Christians, and the Chapel of the Gate of Dawn is visited by thousands of Christian pilgrims annually. The gates were initially part of the defensive Wall of Vilnius; they were given to the Carmelites in the 16th century, who installed a chapel in the gates with a 17th-century Catholic painting: Our Lady of the Gate of Dawn. The painting was later decorated with gold-plated silver and is associated with miracles and a legend.

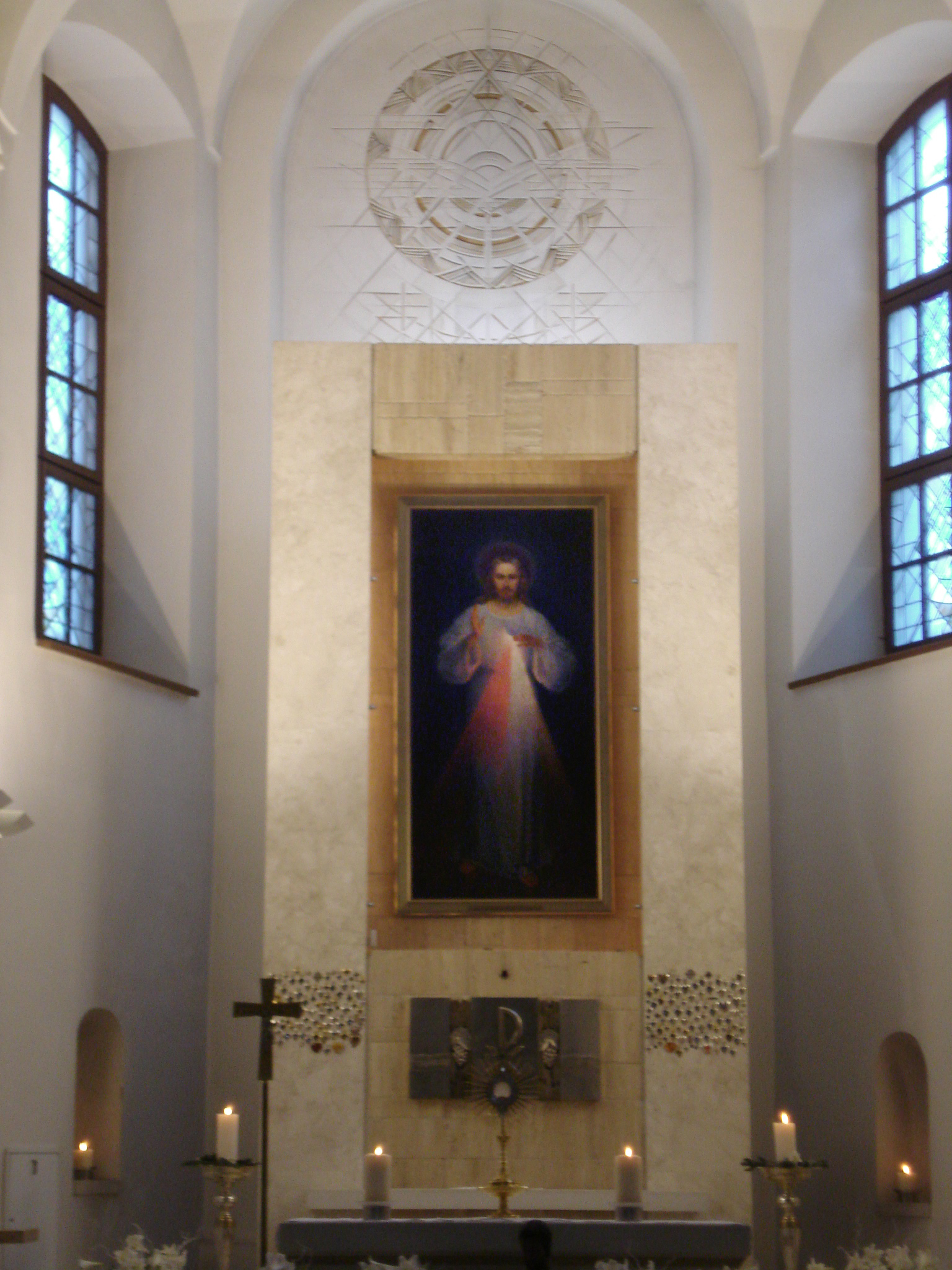
The first Divine Mercy painting by Eugeniusz Kazimirowski (1934) at the Divine Mercy Sanctuary

The Sanctuary of the Divine Mercy is a pilgrimage site which has a Divine Mercy image. Vilnius was the birthplace of the Divine Mercy devotion when Saint Faustina Kowalska began her mission under the guidance of Michał Sopoćko, her spiritual director. The first Divine Mercy image was painted in 1934 by Eugeniusz Kazimirowski under the supervision of Kowalska, and it hangs in the Divine Mercy Sanctuary in Vilnius. Adoration of the Blessed Sacrament takes place in the shrine around the clock. The House of St. Faustina, in Antakalnis' V. Grybo Street, is open to pilgrims.

The Church of St. Philip and St. Jacob, near Lukiškės Square, has the painting of the Mother of God of Lukiškės which has reportedly attracted miracles. The icon, painted in the 15th or 16th century, is one of the country's oldest examples of easel painting. It was brought by Grand Duchy of Lithuania artillery general Motiejus Korvinas Gosievskis from the Russo-Polish War. Since 1684, miracles have been reported at the Vilnius Dominican monastery related to the image which were published in a 1737 book, Mystical Fountain (Lithuanian: Mistinis fontanas). The icon was restored and returned to the Dominicans in 2012.

Three Crosses is a monument in the city. According to a legend in the Bychowiec Chronicle, fourteen Franciscan friars were invited to Vilnius from Podolia by Petras Goštautas. The friars preached the gospel and denigrated pagan Lithuanian gods; angry city residents burned the monastery and killed the fourteen friars. Seven were beheaded on Bleak Hill, and the other seven were crucified and thrown into the Neris or Vilnia.

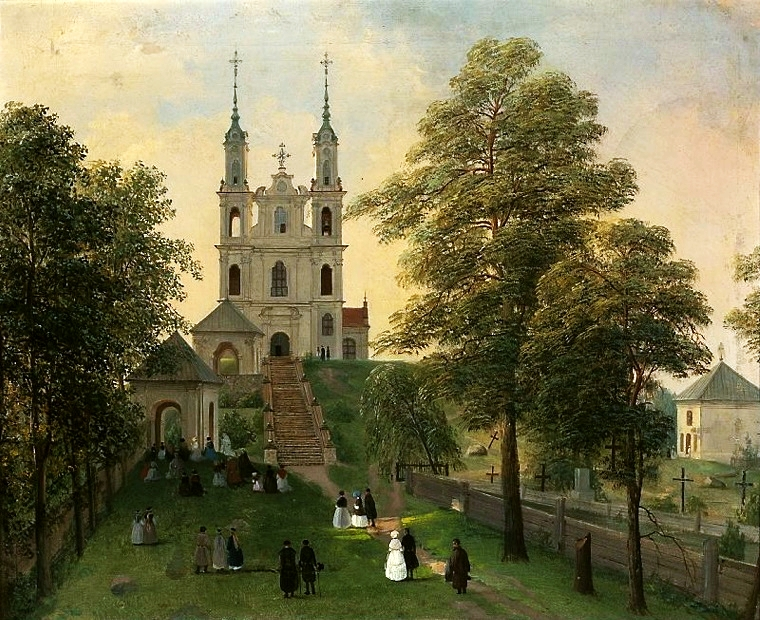
Verkiai Calvary c. 1840s, built in gratitude for victory in the Second Northern War

Verkiai Calvary (or Vilnius Calvary), Lithuania's second-oldest calvary, is in the neighborhood of Verkiai. The calvary was built from 1662 to 1669 in gratitude for victory in the Second Northern War (1655–60). The consecration ceremony of the Stations of the Cross took place for Pentecost on 9 June 1669. The calvary includes 20 brick chapels, seven wooden gates and a brick one, and a bridge with a wood chapel. The path ends at the Church of the Discovery of the Holy Cross. All the chapels except the four closest to the church were destroyed by Soviet authorities overnight with dynamite in 1962. The calvary was reconstructed from 1990 to 2002, and the chapels were consecrated on Pentecost in 2002. Pilgrimages to the calvary are organized regularly with the clergy.

The Church Heritage Museum (Lithuanian: Bažnytinio paveldo muziejus) contains city's the oldest and largest collection of liturgical artefacts in the Roman Catholic Archdiocese of Vilnius. Vilnius is the only city in the Baltic states with an Apostolic Nunciature, where Pope John Paul II and Pope Francis stayed during their visits to Lithuania, Latvia and Estonia.

== Parks, squares and cemeteries ==
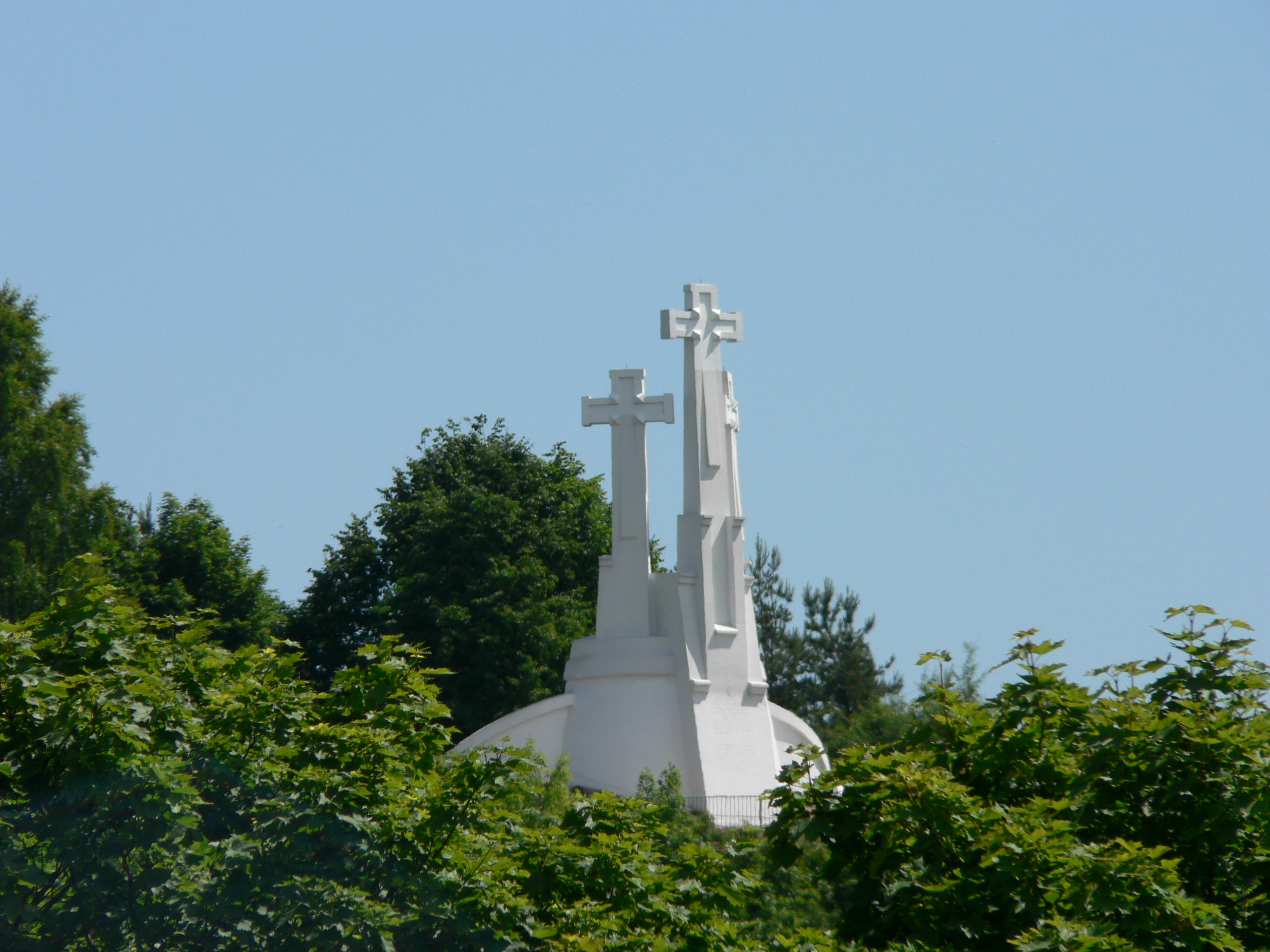
The Three Crosses in Kalnai Park

Almost half of Vilnius is covered by green space such as parks, public gardens, and nature reserves. The city has a number of lakes where residents and visitors swim and barbecue in the summer. Thirty lakes and 16 rivers cover 2.1 percent of Vilnius's area, some of which have sand beaches.

Vingis Park, the city's largest, hosted several large rallies during Lithuania's drive towards independence in the 1980s. Sections of the annual Vilnius Marathon are on public walkways along the Neris. The green area next to the White Bridge is a popular place to enjoy good weather, and has become a venue for several musical and film events.

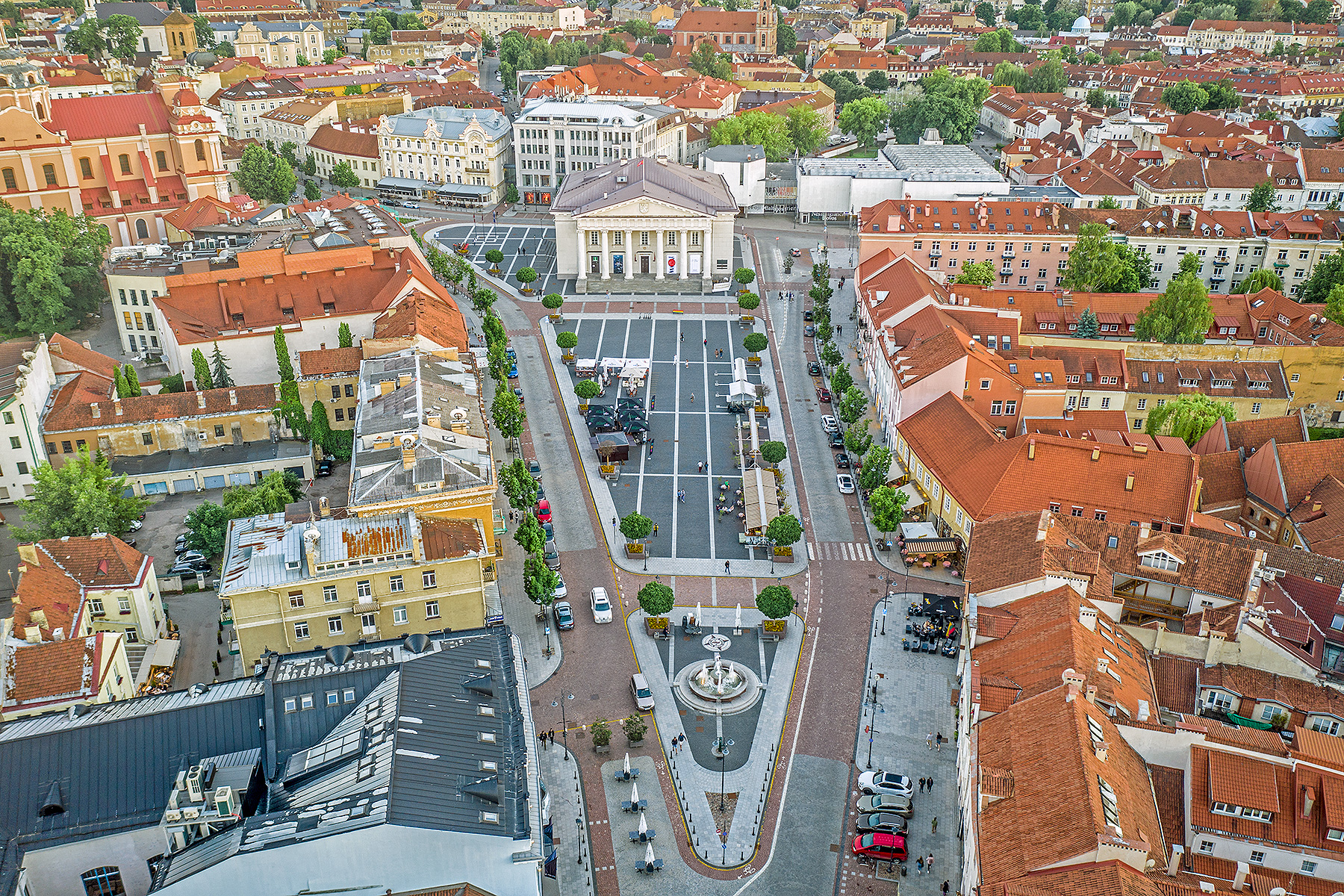
Town Hall Square

Cathedral Square in the Old Town is surrounded by a number of the city's most historic sites. Lukiškės Square is the largest, bordered by several government buildings: the Lithuanian Ministry of Foreign Affairs, Ministry of Finance, Polish Embassy and the Genocide Victims' Museum, where the KGB tortured and killed opponents of the communist regime. A large statue of Vladimir Lenin in its centre was removed in 1991. Town Hall Square has been a centre of trade fairs, celebrations and events, including the Kaziukas Fair. The city's Christmas tree is displayed there. State ceremonies are often held in Daukanto Square, facing the Presidential Palace.

Town Hall Square has also been host to the Vilnius Portal since 2021, the first in the world. Visitors can view the following locations for three minutes at a time:

- Lublin, Poland
- Dublin, Ireland
- Ipswich, United Kingdom
- Philadelphia, United States

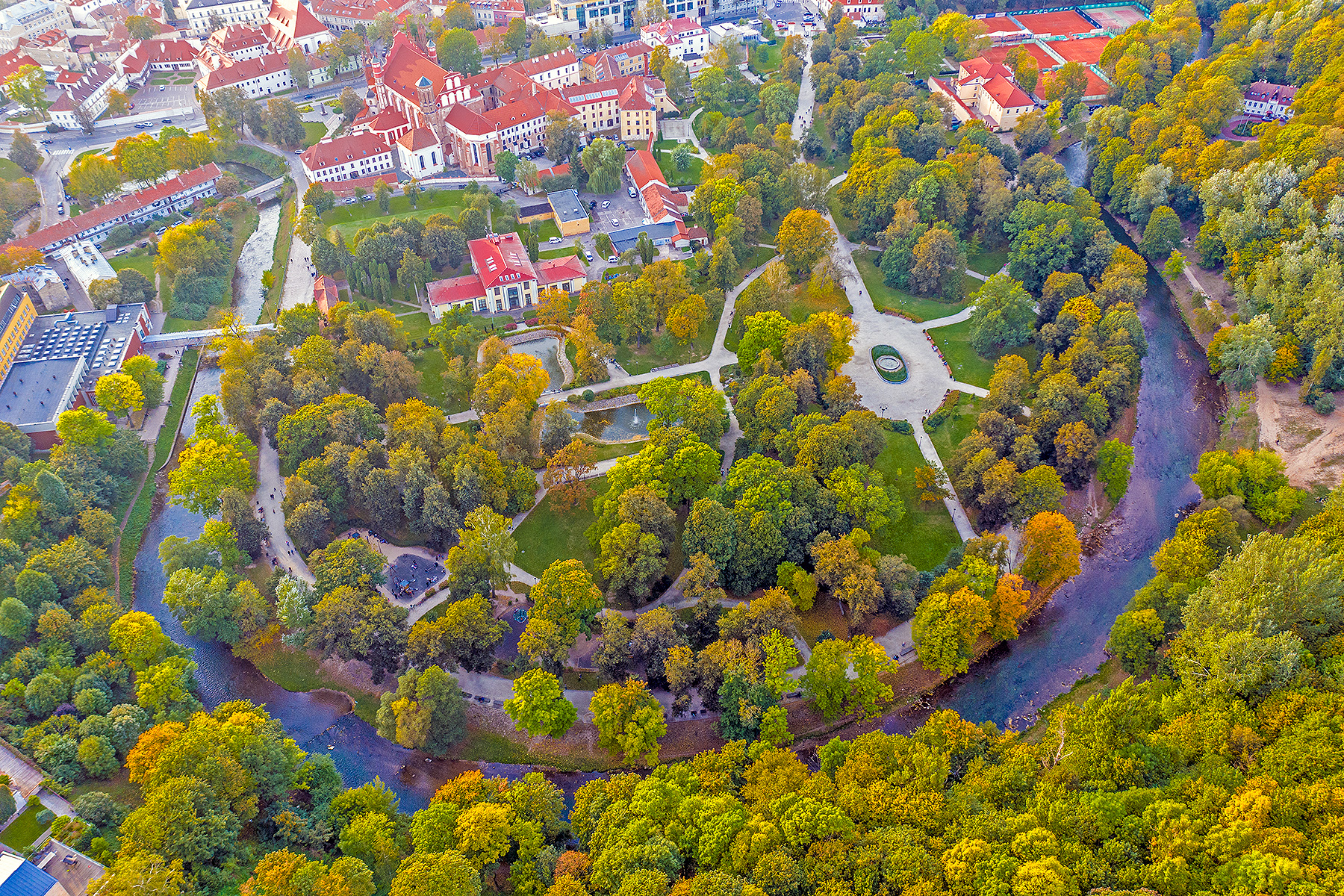
Bernardinai Garden

Bernardinai Garden, near Gediminas Tower (previously known as Sereikiškės Park), opened on 20 October 2013 after it was restored to its 19th-century Vladislovas Štrausas environment. It is a venue for concerts, festivals, and exhibitions. Chiune Sugihara Sakura Park was established in 2001, and a Japanese garden (both in Šnipiškės) was opened in 2023.

Rasos Cemetery, consecrated in 1801, is the burial site of Jonas Basanavičius and other signatories of the 1918 Act of Independence and the heart of Polish leader Józef Piłsudski. Two of the city's three Jewish cemeteries were destroyed by communist authorities during the Soviet era, and the remains in the Vilna Gaon were moved to the remaining one. A monument was erected at the site of Užupis Old Jewish Cemetery was. The Bernardine Cemetery, established in 1810, has about 18,000 burials; closed during the 1970s, it is being restored. Antakalnis Cemetery, established in 1809, has memorials to Polish, Lithuanian, German and Russian soldiers and the graves of those who were killed during the January Events.

== Tourism ==
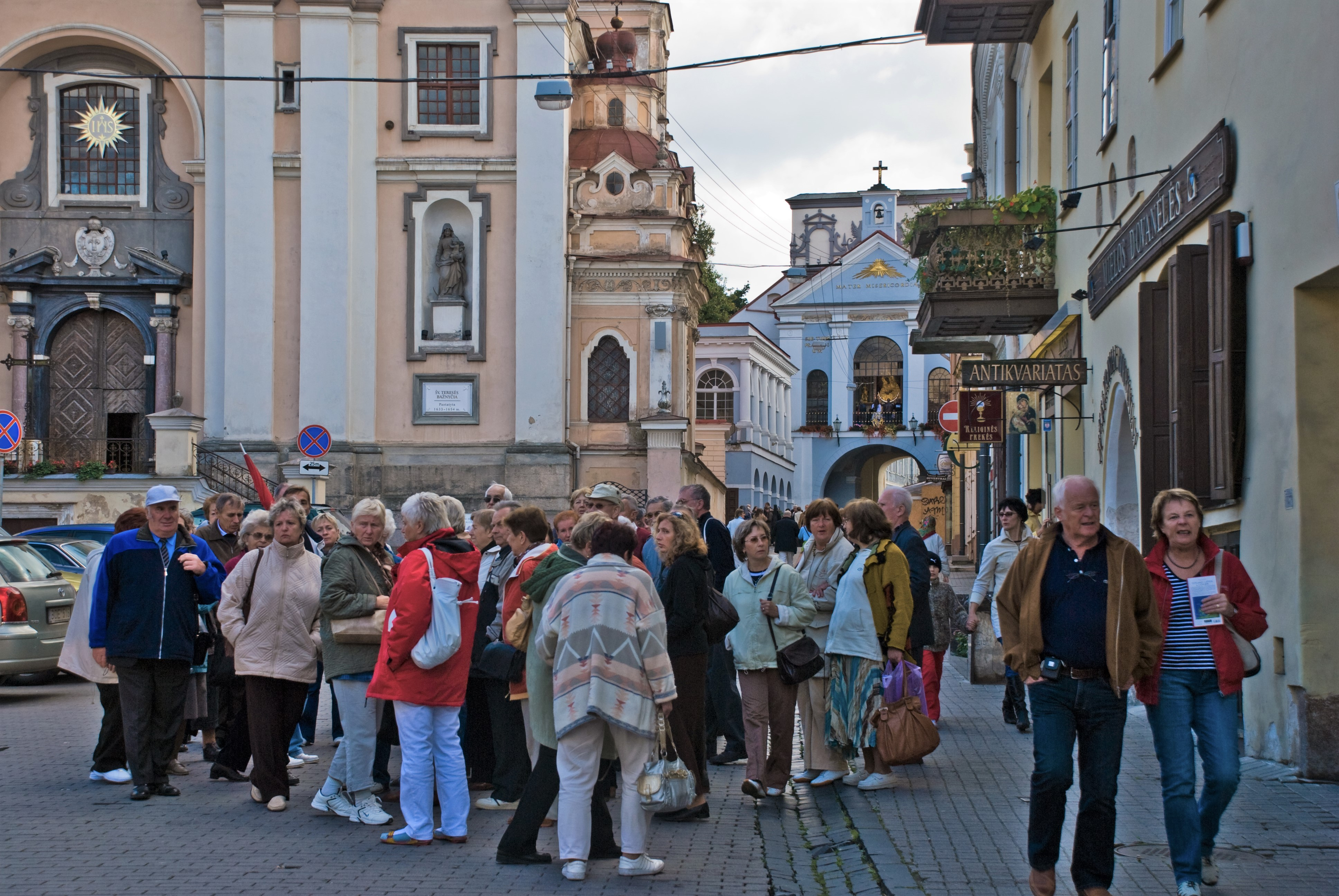
Tourists in the Old Town

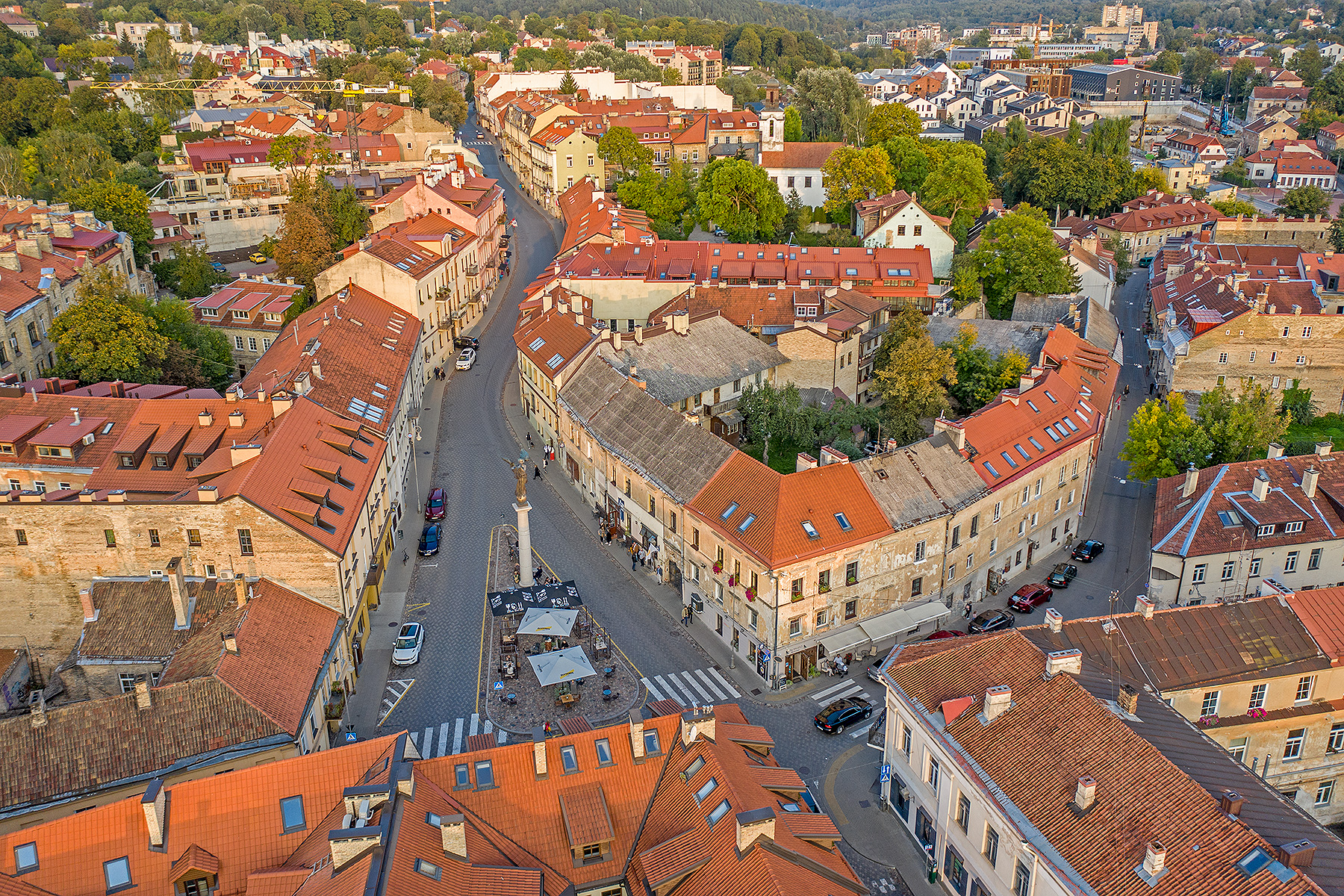
Užupis, a self-proclaimed republic, has Bohemian culture and art.

According to Lithuanian Department of Statistics, 1,200,858 visitors rented rooms in Vilnius in 2018 and spent a total of 2,212,109 nights there; this was a respective increase of 12 percent and 11 percent over the previous year. Eighty-one percent of the visitors were foreigners (970,577), 11 percent more than in 2017. Most foreign visitors (47 percent) came from Belarus (102,915), Germany (101,999), Poland (99,386), Russia (90,388) and Latvia (61,829). Nineteen percent of the guests were Lithuanian, 18 percent more than in 2017.

A 2018 Vilnius visitor survey reported that 48 percent were visiting the city for the first time, 85 percent of tourists planned the trip by themselves, and 15 percent used a travel agency. Forty percent said that they visited Vilnius to learn about the city's history and heritage, with 23 percent also planning trips to other parts of Lithuania. Many Belarusians (about 200,000 travel visas annually) visit the city's shopping malls and submit half-meter-long receipts to customs officials.

Vilnius's Tourist Information Centres were visited by 119,136 visitors in 2018 (95,932 foreigners and 23,204 Lithuanians), a five-percent increase over 2017. The city's highest-rated tourist services are restaurants (cafés), old-town attractions, hotels or other accommodations, trips to Trakai, parks and other green zones, connections to Vilnius Čiurlionis International Airport, and food in hotels, restaurants and cafés. Vilnius is one of a few European capitals which allows hot air ballooning through the city, with nearly 1,000 trips in 2022. In the City Costs Barometer 2019, Vilnius was ranked number one of European capitals for offering the best value to visitors. The controversial Vilnius Palace of Concerts and Sports, built by Soviet authorities on the site of a Jewish graveyard, was scheduled to become the leading convention center in the Baltic states in 2022.

=== Hotels ===
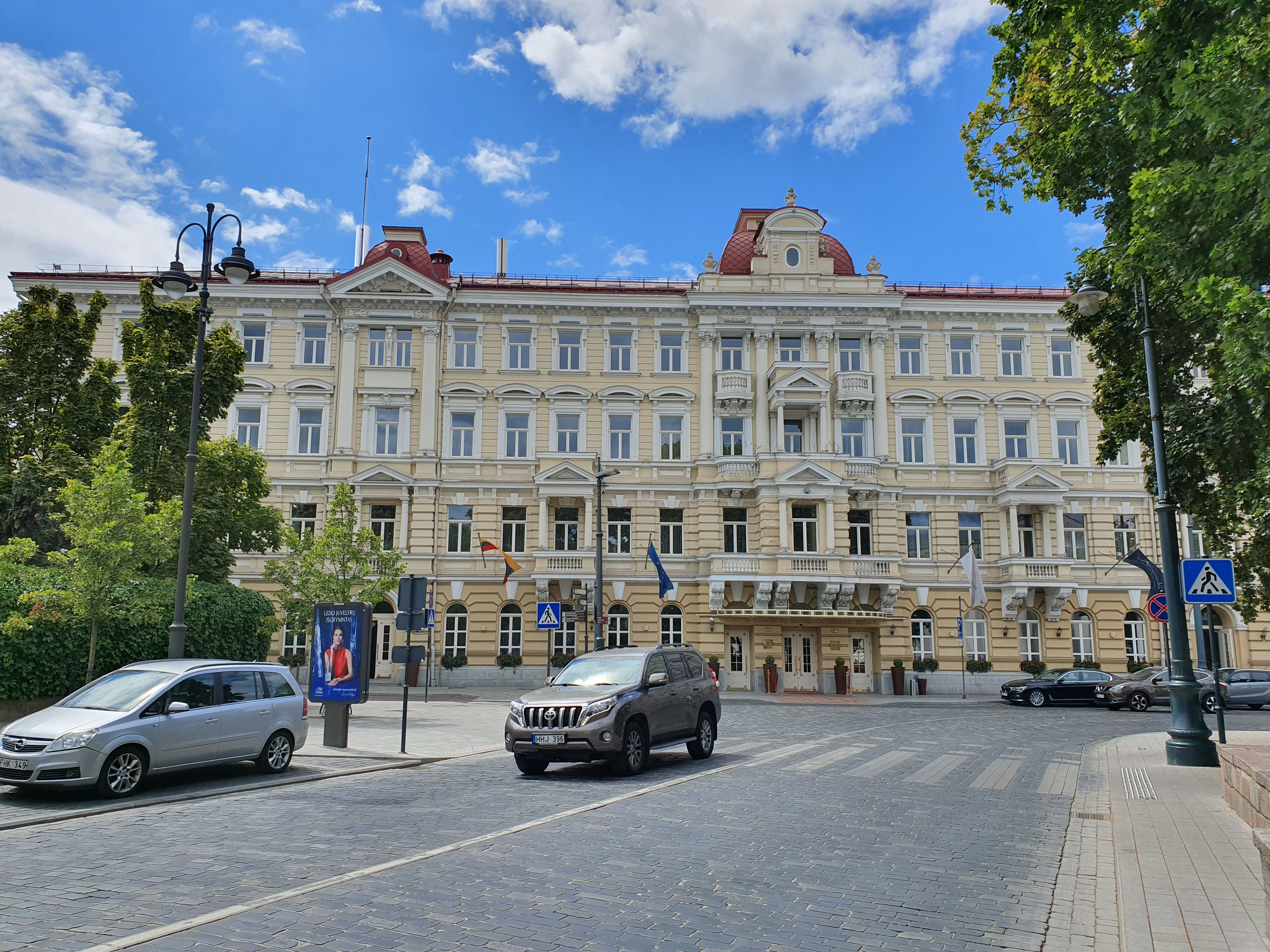
The Kempinski Hotel

Lithuania is a member of the European Hotelstars Union. Vilnius has six five-star hotels, all in the Old Town, and 27 four-star hotels. The Kempinski Hotel, with a view of Cathedral Square, is considered the city's most luxurious hotel.

According to a 2018 Vilnius visitors' survey, 44 percent stayed in mid-range hotels (three or four stars), 12 percent stayed in standard or economy hotels (one or two stars) and 11 percent stayed in five-star hotels. The city had 82 hotels, eight motels and 40 other accommodation facilities in 2019, with 6,822 rooms and 15,248 beds. The highest hotel-room occupancy was in August, and the lowest was in February.

== Sports ==
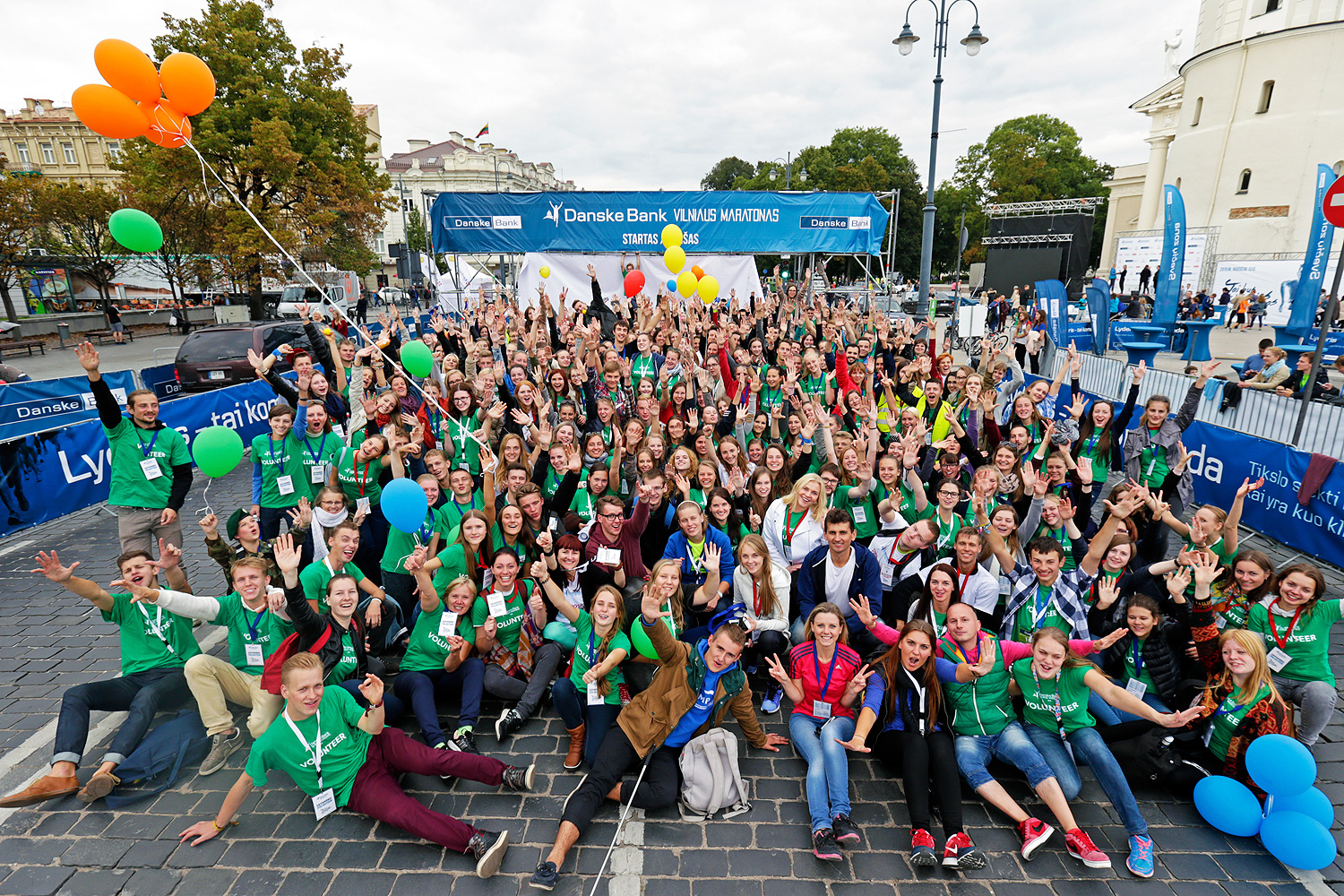
2015 Vilnius Marathon volunteers

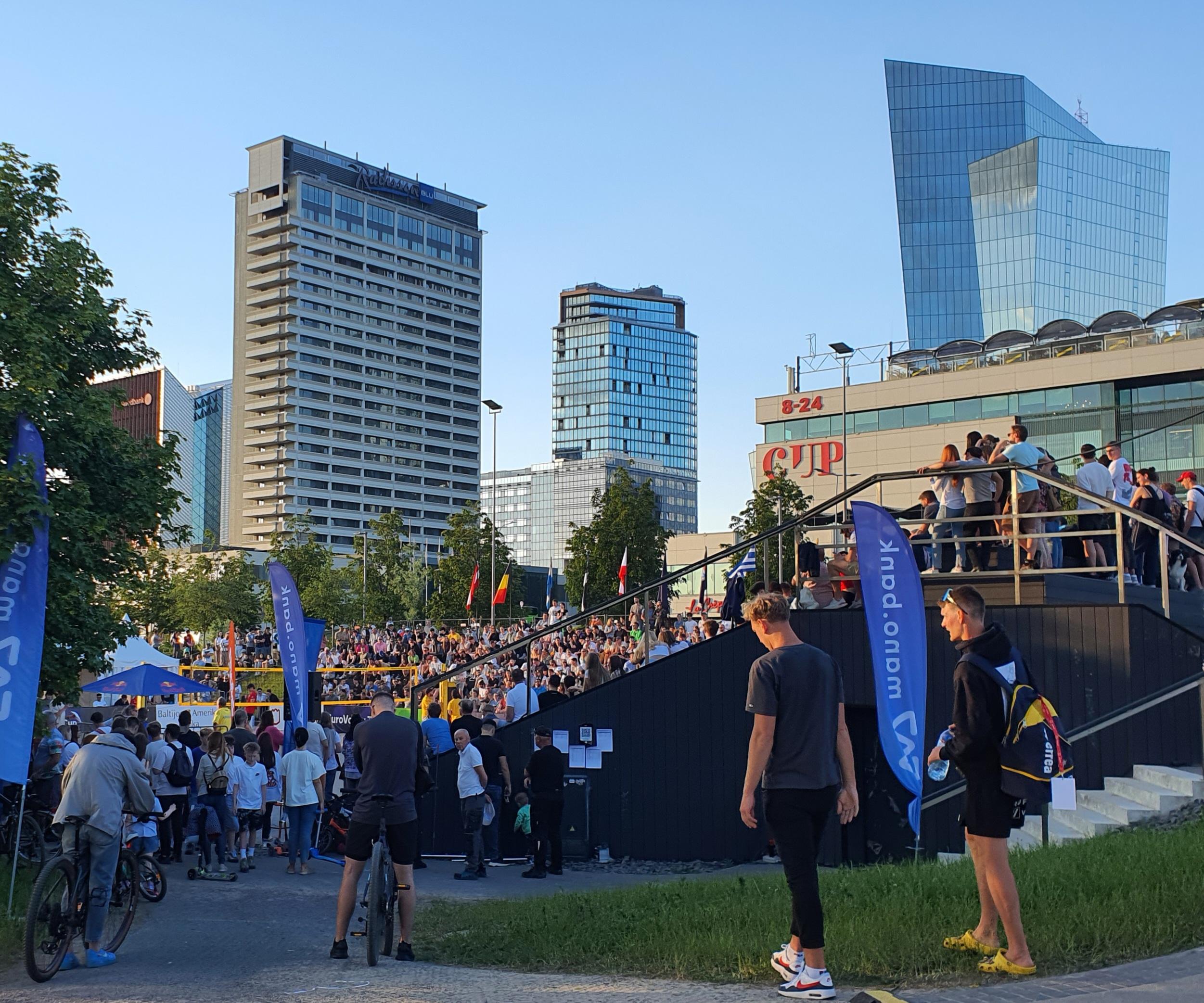
The 2024 CEV Beach Volley Nations Cup tournament was held in the central business district.

Several basketball teams are based in the city. BC Wolves began competing in the 2022–23 season of the Lithuanian Basketball League (LKL). The largest team is BC Rytas, who participates in the international Basketball Champions League (BCL) and the LKL; they won the ULEB Cup (predecessor to the EuroCup) in 2005 and the EuroCup in 2009. Their home arena is the 2,500-seat Jeep Arena; all European matches and important domestic matches are played at the 10,000-seat Twinsbet Arena.

Vilnius also has several football teams; FK Žalgiris, the main team, plays at the 5,000-seat LFF Stadium. The multi-use Lithuania National Stadium is under construction. The 28-court SEB Arena is the largest tennis complex in central Europe and home of the Lithuanian tennis and squash teams.

Olympic swimming champions Lina Kačiušytė and Robertas Žulpa are from Vilnius. The city has several public swimming pools, with the Lazdynai Swimming Pool the only Olympic-size swimming pool. Vilnius is home to the Lithuanian Bandy Association, Badminton Federation, Canoeing Sports Federation, Baseball Association, Biathlon Federation, Sailors Union, Football Federation, Fencing Federation, Cycling Sports Federation, Archery Federation, Athletics Federation, Ice Hockey Federation, Basketball Federation, Curling Federation, Rowing Federation, Wrestling Federation, Speed Skating Association, Gymnastics Federation, Equestrian Union, Modern Pentathlon Federation, Shooting Union, Triathlon Federation, Volleyball Federation, Tennis Union, Taekwondo Federation, Weightlifting Federation, Table Tennis Association, Skiing Association, Rugby Federation, and Swimming Federation. The annual international Vilnius Marathon has thousands of participants.

== Transport ==
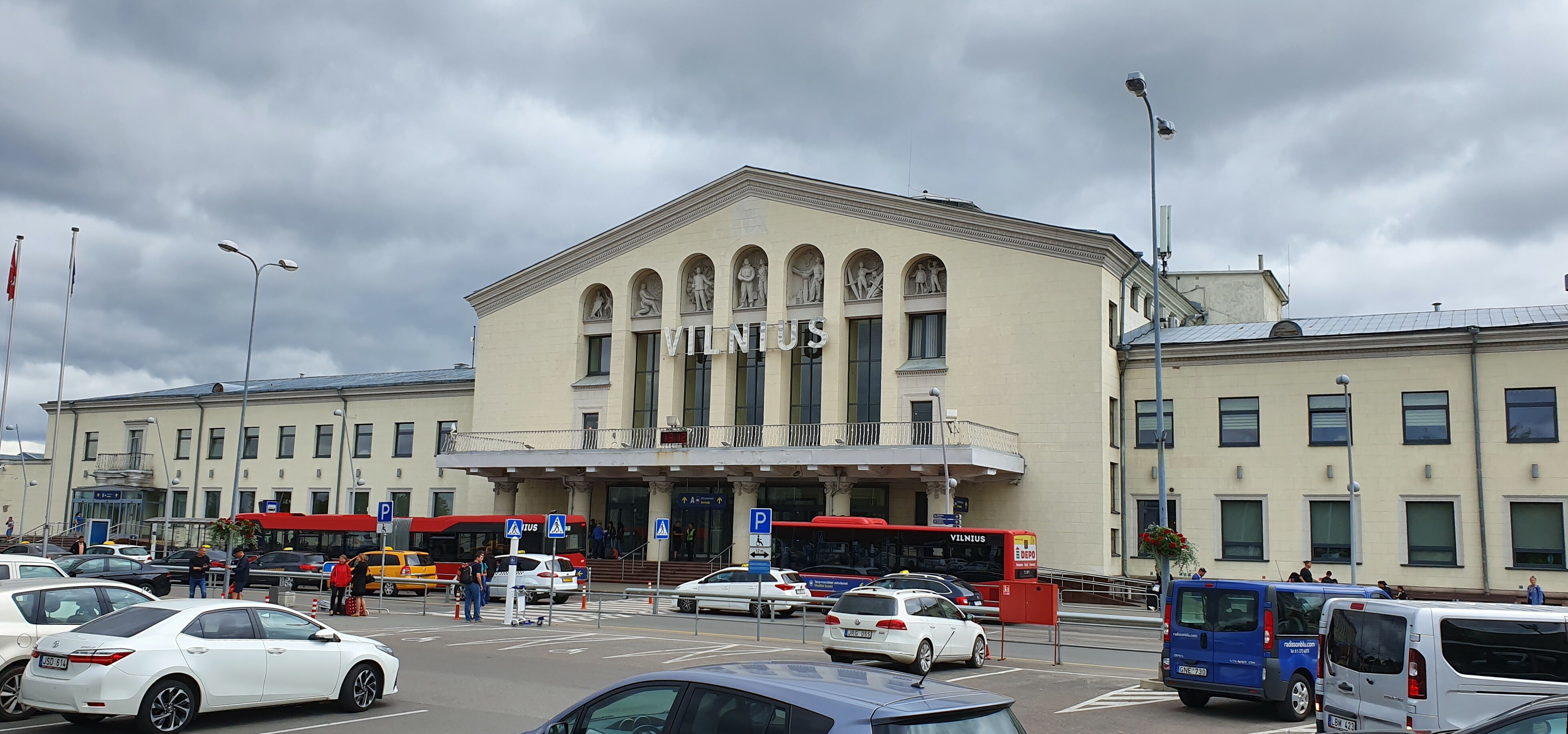
Vilnius Čiurlionis International Airport main entrance

Navigability of the Neris is limited; no regular water routes exist outside of Vilnius, although it was used for transport in the past. Local transport on the river in Vilnius started in 2025 with electric boats. Vilnius Čiurlionis International Airport, Lithuania's largest, serves about 50 cities in 25 countries. The airport, 5 km (3.1 mi) from the city centre, has a direct link to the Vilnius railway station. The station is a rail hub with direct passenger service to Minsk, Kaliningrad, Moscow and Saint Petersburg, and is part of the Pan-European Corridor IX's Branch B.

Vilnius is the starting point of the A1 motorway which runs across Lithuania, connecting its three major cities (Vilnius, Kaunas and Klaipėda), and is part of European route E85. The A2, connecting Vilnius and Panevėžys, is part of the E272. Other highways out of the city include the A3, A4, A14, A15, and A16. Vilnius's southern bypass is the A19.

=== Public transport service ===
The bus, trolleybus and boat networks are operated by Vilniaus viešasis transportas. JUDU (SĮ Susisiekimo paslaugos) is the public mobility agency responsible for planning, managing, and ticketing. There are 125 bus, 16 trolleybus, six rapid bus, 9 night bus routes and one boat route. The trolleybus network is one of Europe's most extensive; over 250 buses and 260 trolleybuses transport about 500,000 passengers every workday. The first bus routes were established in 1926, and the first trolleybuses were introduced in 1956.

At the end of 2007, an electronic monthly ticket system was introduced in which passengers could buy an electronic card in shops and newsstands and load it with money; monthly e-ticket cards could also be loaded over the Internet. Paper monthly tickets were in use until August 2008. On 15 August 2012, e-cards were replaced by Vilnius Citizen Cards (Vilniečio Kortelė) which could be purchased at newsstands and loaded with money and ticket type. In 2014, a mobile app was introduced for public-transport tickets.

Buses are low-floor Volvo and Mercedes-Benz buses, and trolleybuses are manufactured by Solaris. Older Škoda vehicles, built in the Czech Republic and many refurbished, are still in service. In 2004, a contract was signed with Volvo Buses to purchase 90 new 7700 buses over a three-year period.

In 2017, Vilnius began the largest upgrade of its bus service by purchasing 250 new low-floor buses. Sixty percent of the city's public buses were new by mid-2018, with free Wi-Fi and chargers for electronic devices. On 5 September 2017, 50 new Isuzu buses were introduced. Vilnius City Municipality accepted bids for 41 new trolleybuses; Solaris contracted to provide the trolleybuses by autumn 2018, with free Wi-Fi and chargers. On 13 November of that year, the municipality signed a contract with Solaris for the remaining 150 fourth-generation Solaris Urbino buses (100 standard and 50 articulated) with free Wi-Fi and USB charging. Five electric Karsan Jest Electric buses were introduced on 20 September 2019 for the number 89 route's narrow streets.

Vilnius Metro and an electric tram have been proposed. In 2018, the Seimas and the president approved a metro project.

In June 2025, JUDU launched their first boat network, and thus using their first electric riverboat that runs on the river Neris. The ferry has stops at Vilnius' most notable bridges like Žvėrynas Bridge, White Bridge, Green Bridge, and Mindaugas Bridge. Boats were built by the Latvian company SIA "BIC Group".

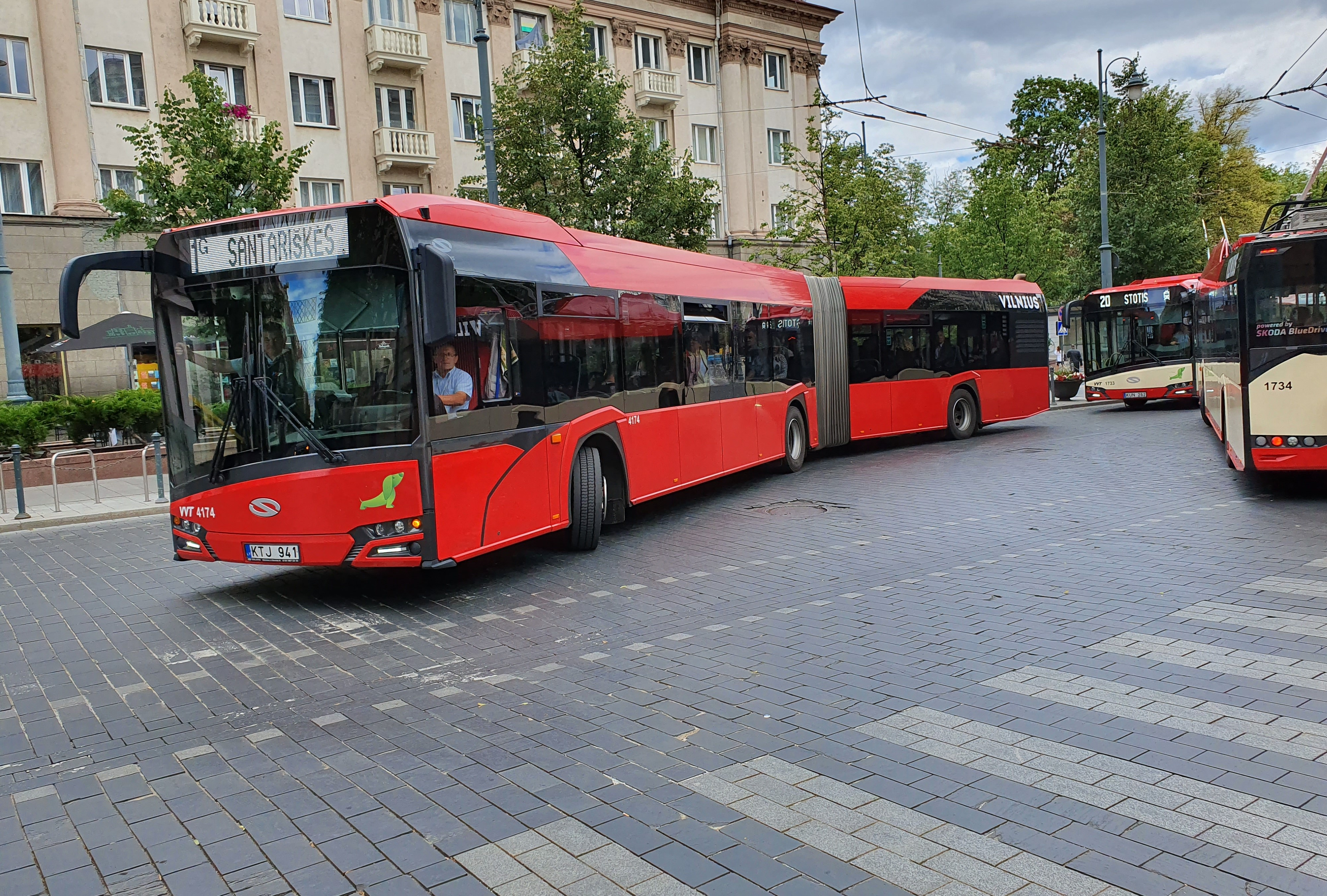
Solaris Urbino 18 bus and Škoda 26Tr Solaris trolleybuses in Vilnius

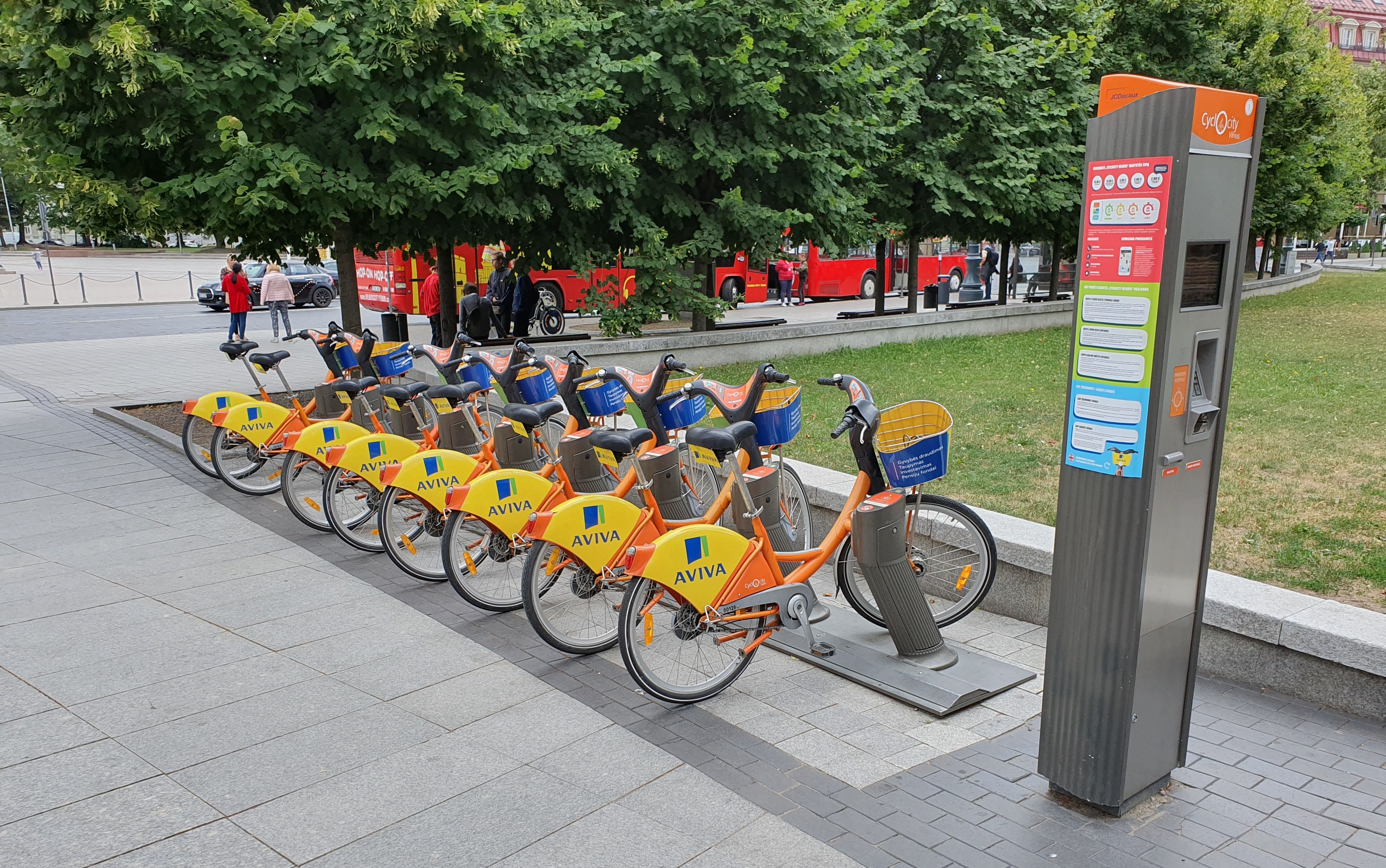
Orange rental bikes

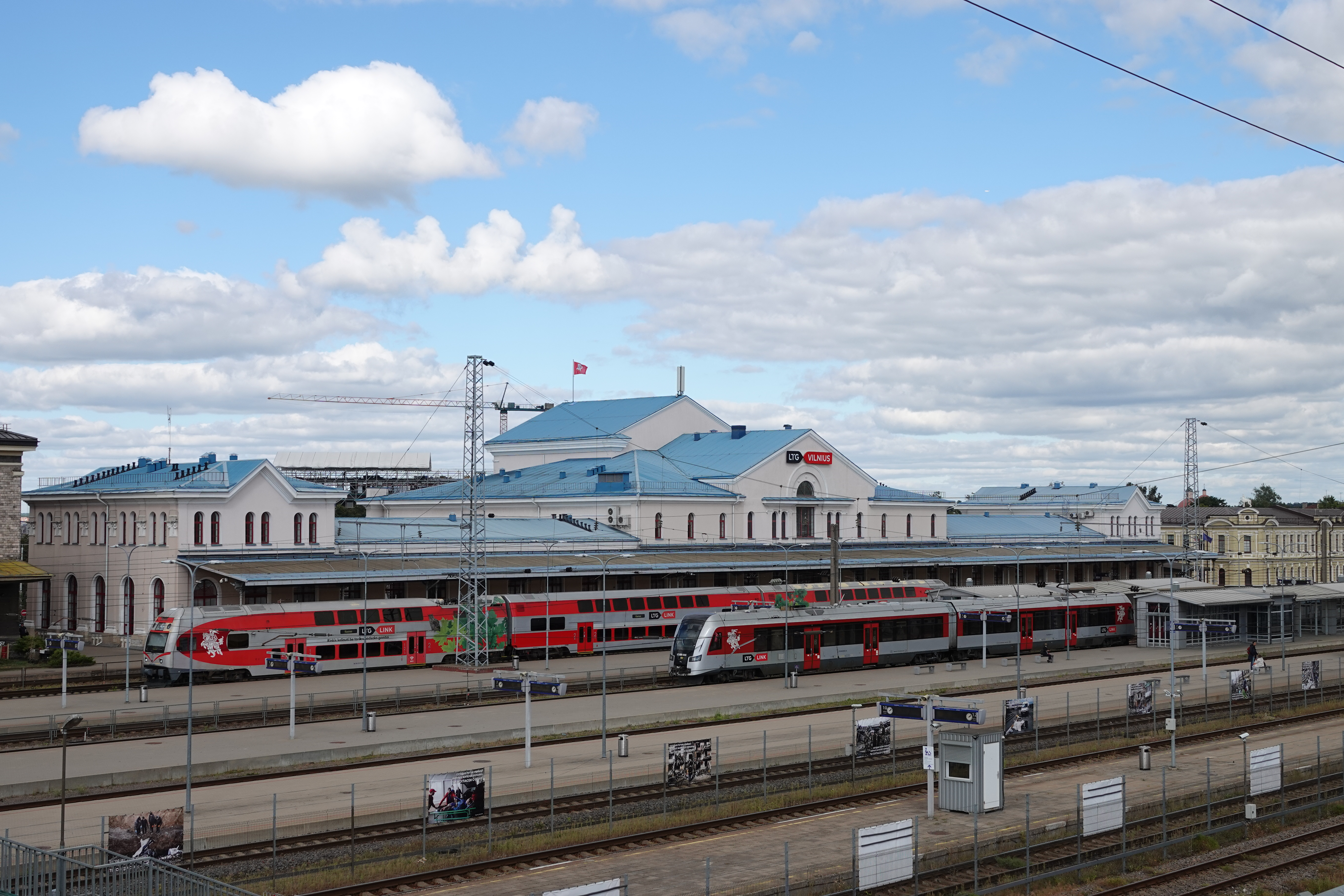
Vilnius railway station

=== Electric vehicle infrastructure ===
Vilnius is the city with the most electric vehicles in Lithuania. The city has tens of public high-power charging stations, provided by a state-owned enterprise Ignitis ON and a municipal enterprise Susisiekimo paslaugos. Vilnius city municipality and the Government of Lithuania encourages the usage of electric vehicles and has granted a number of benefits for such cars users (e.g. six charging stations offers a completely free charging in Vilnius, free parking in the city's public areas, electric vehicles are allowed to drive in a separate A road lane and significantly benefits in the traffic jams, electric and hybrid vehicles license plates begins with a letter E).

== Healthcare ==
When Vilnius was part of the Grand Duchy of Lithuania, the city had public bathhouses; one-fourth the city's houses had individual bathhouses, and almost half had alcohol distilleries. In 1518, doctor and canon Martynas Dušnickis established the first špitolė in Vilnius: Lithuania's first hospital-like institution which treated people unable to care for themselves due to health, age, or poverty.

The Brotherhood of Saint Roch maintained basic hospitals and shelters for the sick and disabled in Vilnius from 1708 to 1799, although it is unknown if the brothers had any medical education. They hired paramedics, doctors, surgeons, and female nurses for female patients. A significant number of patients had sexually transmitted diseases which other Catholic hospitals refused to treat. The brotherhood sheltered pregnant women, abandoned children and patients with injuries, tuberculosis, rheumatism and arthritis.

In 1805, the Vilnius Medical Society was established by Joseph Frank (son of Johann Peter Frank) as the first medical society in eastern Europe. The same year, the society established a teaching hospital (clinic) as part of the Vilnius University Faculty of Medicine. From 1918 to 1941, the Lithuanian Sanitary Aid Society operated in Vilnius.

The Ministry of Health, in Vilnius, is responsible for Lithuanian health care. Vilnians pay compulsory health insurance (6.98 percent of their salary), which is governed by the Vilnius Territorial Health Insurance Fund and guarantees free health care to every insured person. Some residents, such as the disabled, children and full-time students, are exempt from the tax.

Vilnius University Hospital Santaros Klinikos and the Vilnius City Clinical Hospital are the city's primary hospitals. Vilnius also has eight polyclinics, the Medical Centre of the Ministry of the Interior, and a number of private health-care facilities.

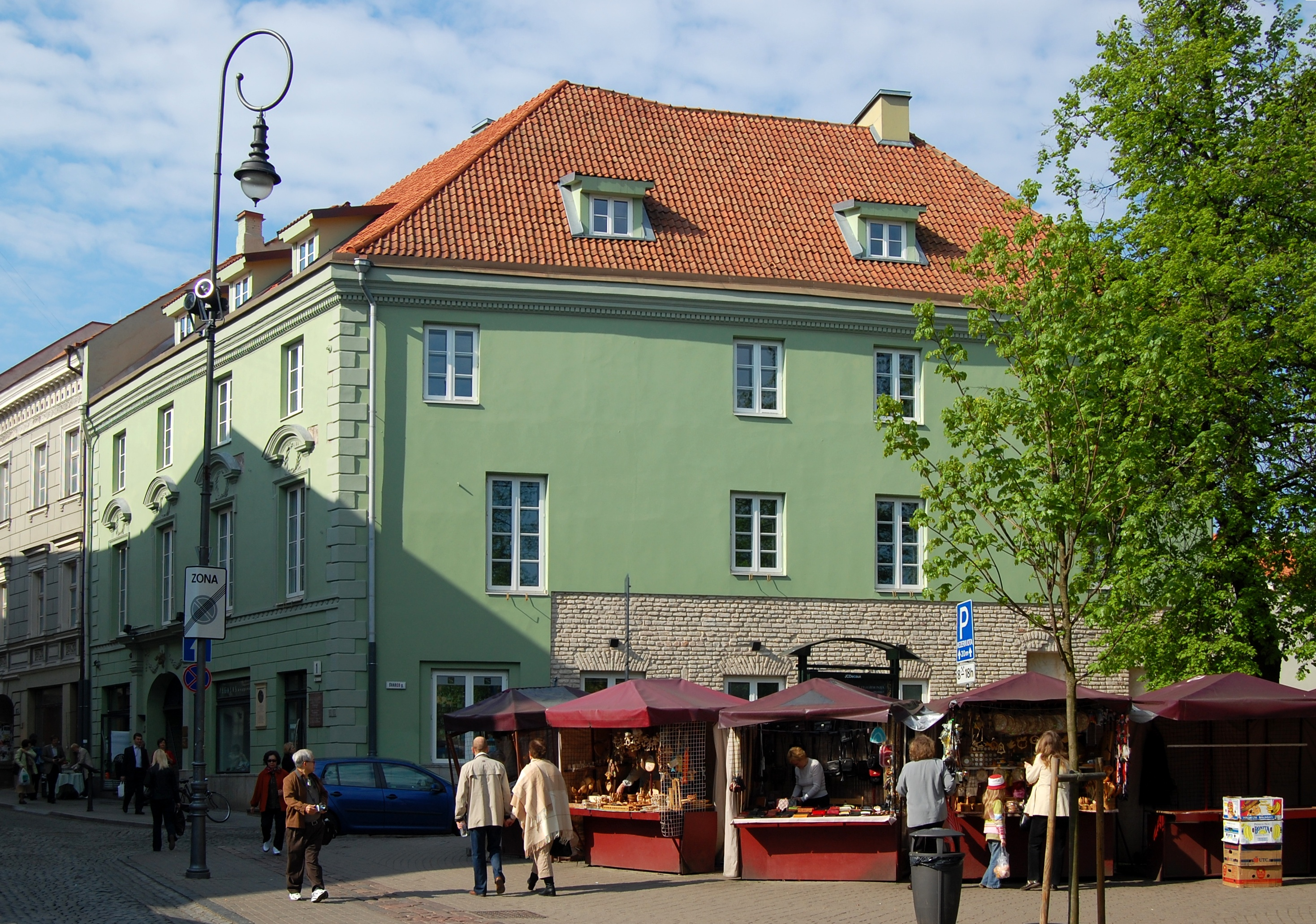
Building in which the Vilnius Medical Society was established in 1805

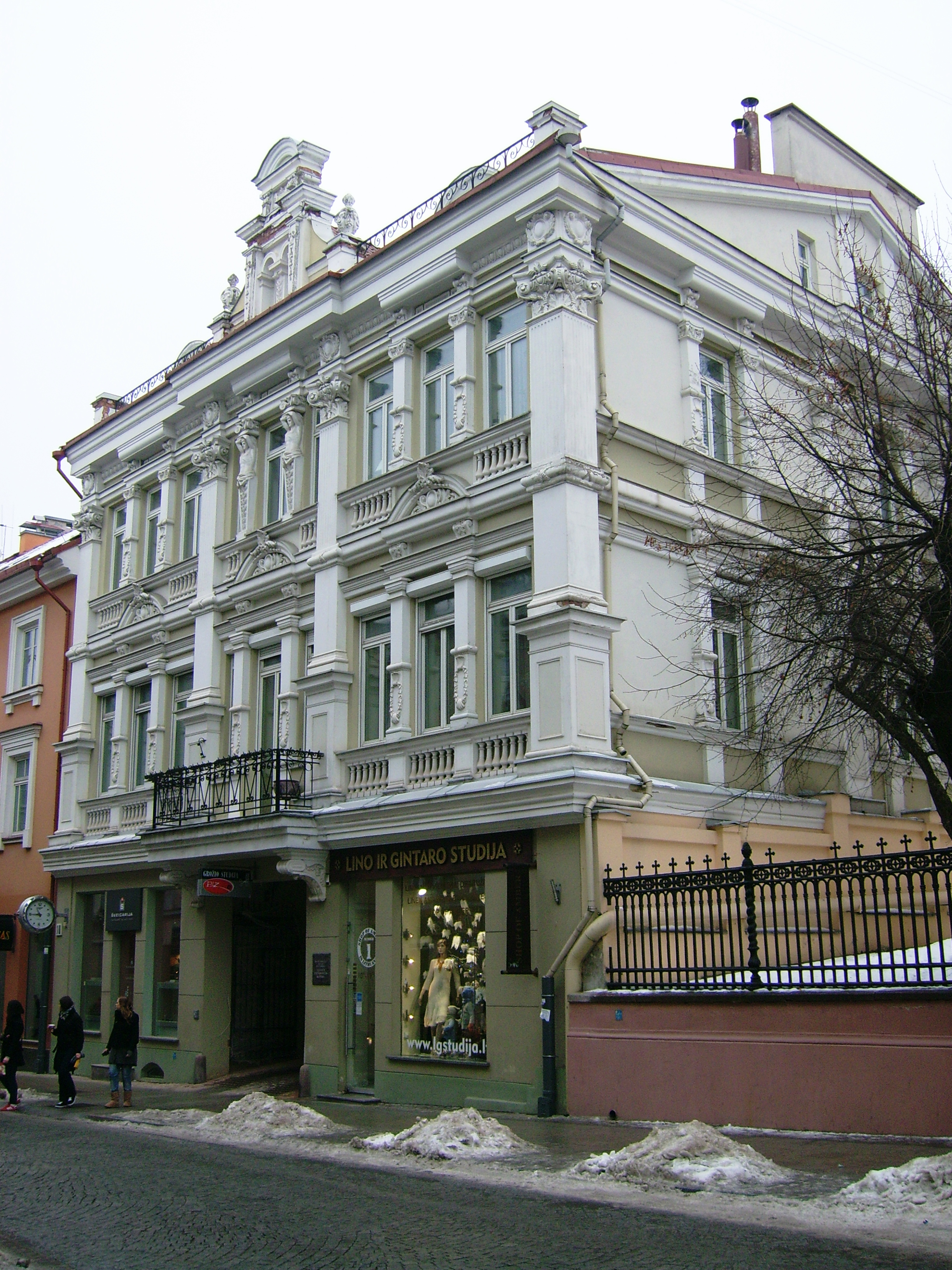
Building which housed Vilnius's first clinic

== Media ==
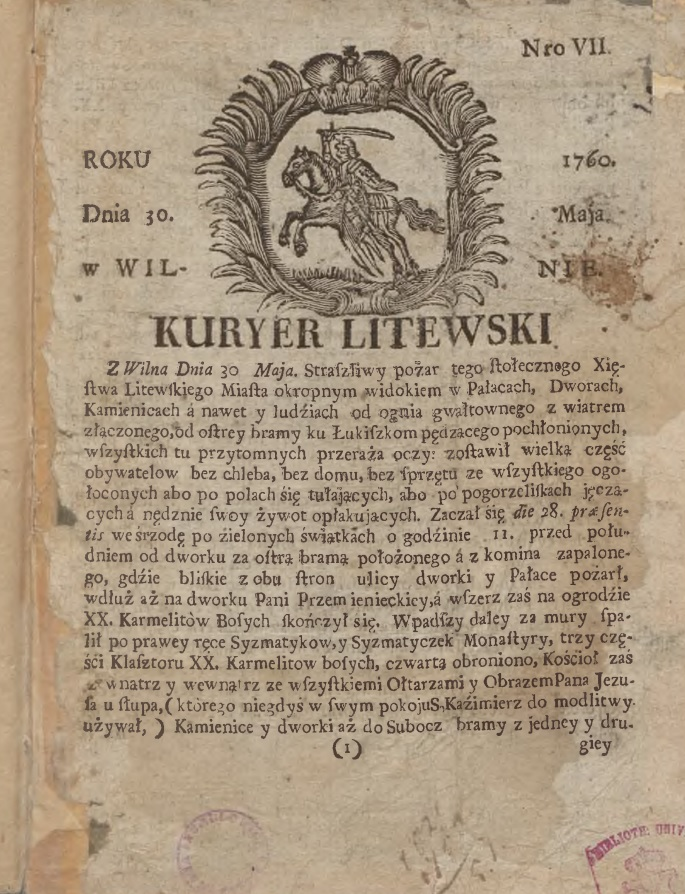
Title page of Kurier Litewski (1760)

The first Lithuanian weekly newspaper, Kurier Litewski, was published in Vilnius from 1760 to 1763. Vilnius is home to a number of newspapers, magazines and other publications, including Lietuvos rytas, Lietuvos žinios, Verslo žinios, Respublika, Valstiečių laikraštis, Mokesčių žinios, Aktualijos, 15min, Vilniaus diena, Vilniaus Kraštas, Lietuvos aidas, Valstybė, Veidas, Panelė, the Franciscan Bernardinai.lt, the Russian Litovskij kurjer and the Polish Tygodnik Wileńszczyzny.

The Vilnius TV Tower in Karoliniškės broadcasts to the city. The most-viewed networks in Lithuania are headquartered in Vilnius and include LRT televizija, TV3, LNK, BTV, LRT Plius, LRT Lituanica, TV6, Lietuvos rytas TV, TV1, TV8, Sport1, Liuks!, Info TV.

Vilnius TV Tower

Vilnius's first radio station, Rozgłośnia Wileńska, began broadcasting in the Žvėrynas microdistrict on 28 November 1927 and was moved to present-day Gediminas Avenue in 1935. M-1, the country's first commercial radio station, began broadcasting from Vilnius in 1989. Other Lithuanian or foreign-language radio stations also broadcast from Vilnius, most from the Vilnius TV Tower or the Vilnius Press House. The Lithuanian Union of Journalists (Lithuanian: Lietuvos žurnalistų sąjunga) and the Lithuanian Society of Journalists (Lithuanian: Lietuvos žurnalistų draugija) are headquartered in Vilnius.

== Twin towns and sister cities ==
Vilnius is twinned with:

- Aalborg, Denmark
- Almaty, Kazakhstan
- Astana, Kazakhstan
- Chicago, United States
- Dnipro, Ukraine
- Donetsk, Ukraine
- Duisburg, Germany
- Erfurt, Germany
- Gdańsk, Poland (1998)
- Guangzhou, China
- Joensuu, Finland
- Kyiv, Ukraine
- Kraków, Poland
- Łódź, Poland
- Madison, United States
- Nagoya, Japan
- Pavia, Italy
- Reykjavík, Iceland
- Riga, Latvia
- Salzburg, Austria
- Taipei, Taiwan
- Tallinn, Estonia
- (Georgia (country)) Tbilisi, Georgia
- Warsaw, Poland

Twin and friendly towns until 2022:

- Irkutsk, Russia
- Kaliningrad, Russia
- Krasnoyarsk, Russia
- Minsk, Belarus
- Saint Petersburg, Russia
- Ulan-Ude, Russia
- Yaroslavl, Russia

== See also ==
- Coat of arms of Vilnius
- List of public art in Vilnius
- List of Vilnius Elderships in other languages
- Neighborhoods of Vilnius
- Vilnius conflict
