= Do Architects =

Architecture firm

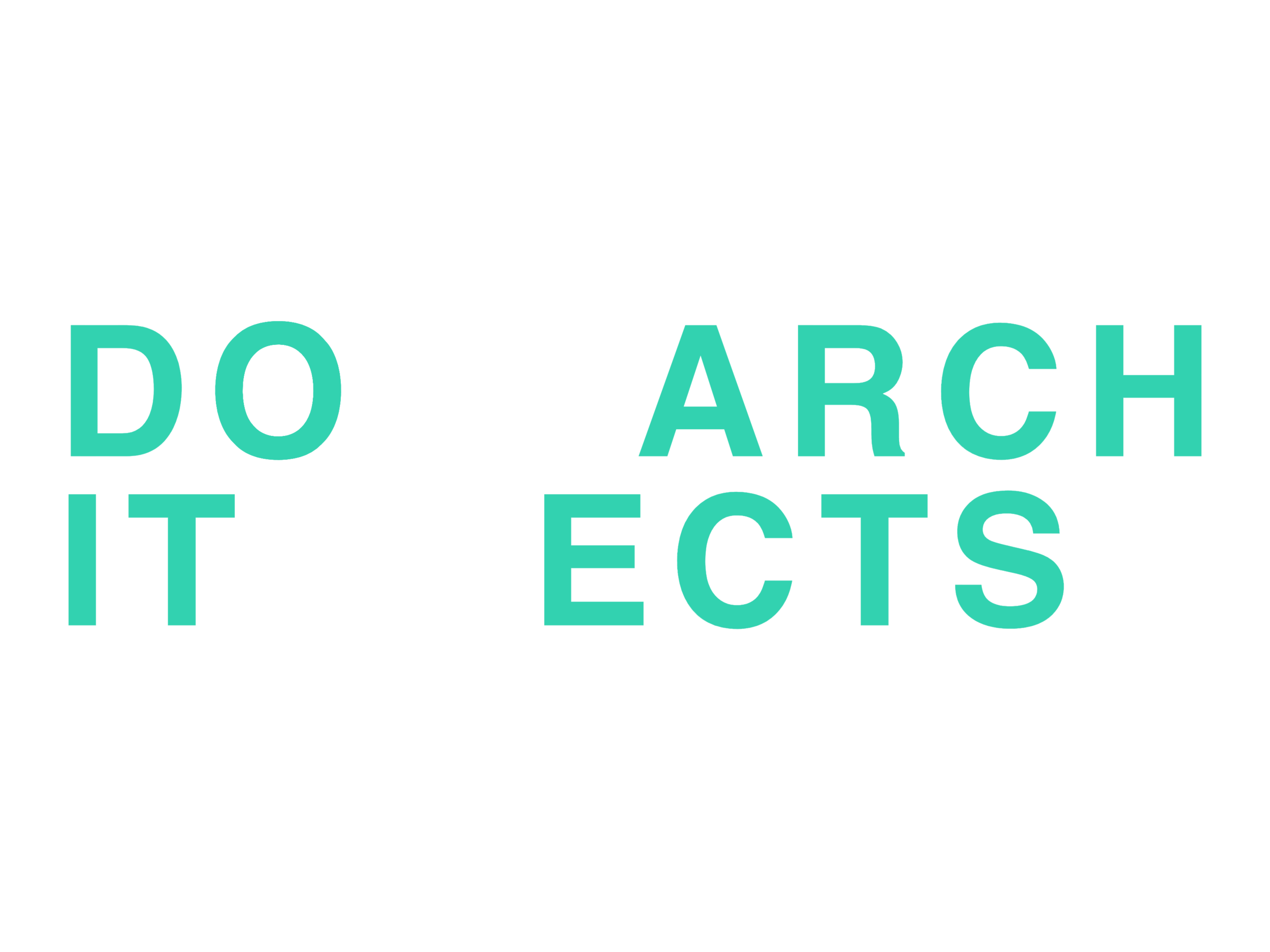
- Company type: Private
- Industry: Architecture
- Founded: 2013; 12 years ago
- Founders: Founding partners: Sabina Grincevičiūtė (CEO), Andrė Baldišiūtė, Gilma Teodora Gylytė, Sabina Grincevičiūtė, Algimantas Neniškis
- Headquarters: Vilnius
- Key people: Partners: Vaiva Šimoliūnaitė-Čečkauskienė, Kasparas Žiliukas, Vadim Babij
- Number of employees: 50+
- Website: https://www.doarchitects.lt/

Do Architects is a Lithuanian architecture and urban design studio founded in Vilnius in 2013 by architects Andrė Baldišiūtė, Gilma Teodora Gylytė, Sabina Grincevičiūtė and Algimantas Neniškis.

The studio focuses on large-scale conversion projects, public spaces, commercial, public and residential buildings.

With more than 50 full-time employees, Do Architects is among the largest architecture firms in both Lithuania and the Baltic states.

Since 2022, Do Architects is headquartered in Betono Fabrikas, a conversion project of a former concrete element factory in Vilnius' Vilkpėdė area. The studio itself is overseeing and advocating for a broader renewal of the territory.

== Recognition ==
The studio is a 7 times nominee for the European Union Prize for Contemporary Architecture (Mies van der Rohe Award) and a 5 times winner of the Lithuanian Contemporary Architecture Award "Žvilgsnis į save" by the Lithuanian Union of Architects.

In 2022, Do Architects was longlisted among the 30 emerging architecture studios of the year in the Dezeen Awards.

== Selected projects ==
Project	
MO Museum, as local partners of Studio Libeskind (2018)	MO Museum, a private contemporary art museum in Vilnius
Business Garden Vilnius (2019)	Business Garden Vilnius, a major business center by Vastint Lithuania in Lazdynai
Svencelė, a city on the water (ongoing)	Master plan and individual homes on the shore of Curonian lagoon
Senatorių pasažas (2021)	Vainiai Palace rehabilitation „Senatorių pasažas“ in Vilnius Old Town
Vilnius Pilaitė Gymnasium	
