= Gilma Teodora Gylytė =

Lithuanian architect

- Born: April 3, 1984; Vilnius, Lithuania
- Occupation: Architect

Gilma Teodora Gylytė (born 3 April 1984 in Vilnius) is a Lithuanian architect, entrepreneur and activist.

== Career ==
Gylytė graduated from Vilnius Gediminas Technical University.

In 2013, Gylytė co-founded Do Architects, one of the largest Baltic architecture and urban design studios.

Gylytė's works - Vainiai Palace, Ogmios City, Svencelė, a villa in Giruliai, Pelėdžiukas kindergarten and Pilaitė gymnasium - were nominated for the European Union Prize for Contemporary Architecture from 2011 to 2023. Gylytė's projects also won main prizes at local awards presented by the Lithuanian Union of Architects and the Lithuanian Ministry of Environment.

In 2022, Gylytė co-founded Rebuild Wonderful Ukraine, an initiative uniting Central and Eastern European architects, lawyers, philosophers and donors with Ukrainian institutions, and promoting human-centric transformations of socialist buildings, primarily Soviet schools.

In 2023, Gylytė served as a member of the jury at the Czech Architecture Awards organized by the Czech Chamber of Architects.

== Personal life ==
In 2021, Gylytė married Remigijus Šimašius, who was then serving as the Mayor of Vilnius, and had previously held the position of Minister of Justice in Lithuania.
