= Andrė Baldišiūtė =

Lithuanian architect

- Born: May 17, 1980 (age 45); Vilnius, Lithuania
- Occupation: Architect

Andrė Baldišiūtė (born 1980) is a Lithuanian architect, urban planner and entrepreneur.

== Biography ==
Baldišiūtė was born in 1980 to a family of Rimantas Baldišius, a Lithuanian caricaturist. She graduated from the Vilnius Gediminas Technical University with an architecture degree in 2002 and earned a master's degree from the Amsterdam Architecture Academy in 2006. She was a lecturer in architecture at Vilnius Gediminas Technical University from 2006 to 2013.

In 2006, she founded her practice "Andrė Baldi architektūra-urbanistika".

In 2010, Baldišiūtė joined "Architektūros fondas", an NGO promoting architecture awareness in Lithuania, and co-founded "A Talks," a series of public conversations dedicated to architecture.

In 2013, Baldišiūtė co-founded Do Architects, one of the largest Baltic architecture and urban design studios.

As a lead architect, she worked on projects nominated for the European Union Prize for Contemporary Architecture, such as the master plan and residential and commercial quarters for Svencelė, Lithuania's first town on the water with a canal network, as well as Ogmios City, the transformation of a 12-hectare Soviet military base in northern Vilnius into a multifunctional and fully integrated city quarter. Baldišiūtė's portfolio also includes dozens of large-scale residential, commercial and urban redevelopment projects.

In 2021, Vilnius City Municipality introduced the Vilnius Street Design Manual, a guide for creating new streets and transforming existing ones into people-first public spaces. Co-created by Baldišiūtė’s team and other partners, it was the first document of its kind in the region and has already been applied in projects on streets such as Naugarduko, Giedraičių, Vileišio, Kernavės and Ševčenkos.

In 2019-2020 and since 2023, Baldišiūtė has been a member of the Council of the Architects’ Chamber of Lithuania, a body regulated by law and overseeing Lithuanian architect certification and compliance with professional ethics standards, among other duties. Also since 2023, Baldišiūtė has been a member of the Vilnius Regional Council of Architects, a body responsible for evaluating new developments in the Vilnius area.

In 2024, Baldišiūtė’s team introduced the “Vilkpėdė 2080” project, a vision to transform a large industrial area south of Vilnius city center into residential, administrative and recreational quarters that embrace the existing river and incorporate new waterways. The presentation was co-hosted by the Lithuanian Real Estate Development Association.
