= Church of the Providence of God, Vilnius =

Roman Catholic church in Vilnius, Lithuania

Church of the Providence of God Dievo Apvaizdos bažnyčia
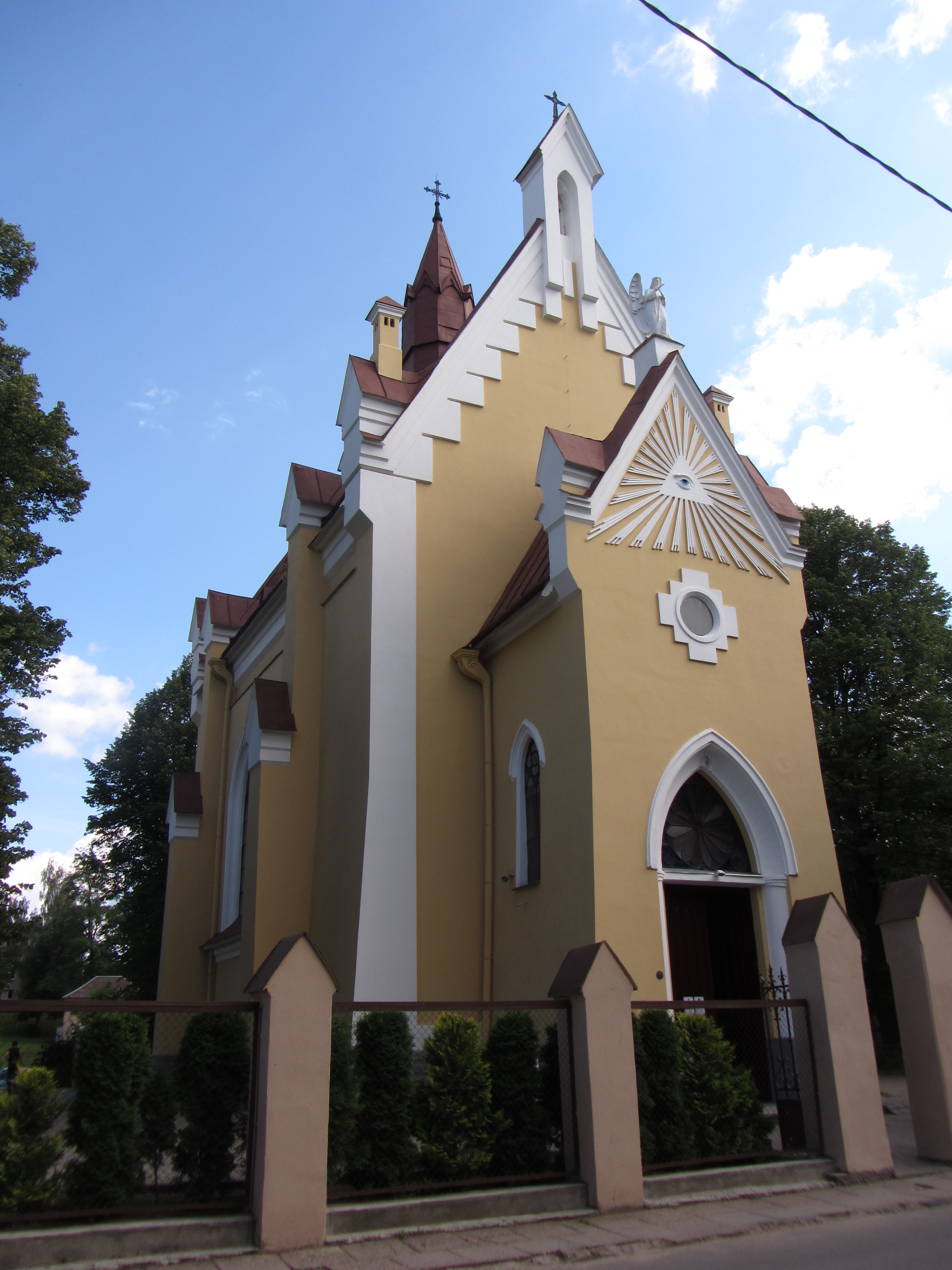
- Façade of the church in 2014

Religion
- Affiliation: Roman Catholic
- Diocese: Vilkpėdė
- Leadership: Roman Catholic Archdiocese of Vilnius
- Year consecrated: 1913

Location
- Location: Vilnius, Lithuania
- Interactive map of Church of the Providence of God; Dievo Apvaizdos bažnyčia
- Coordinates: 54°40′10″N 25°14′40″E

Architecture
- Architect: Antoni Wiwulski
- Type: Church
- Style: Gothic Revival
- Completed: 1913
- Materials: Plastered masonry

Website
- Gerojiviltis.lt

Church of the Providence of God (Lithuanian: Dievo Apvaizdos bažnyčia) is a Roman Catholic church in Vilkpėdė, one of the neighborhoods of Vilnius, which was completed in 1913 according to a Gothic Revival architecture style project by Antanas Vivulskis.

== Gallery ==
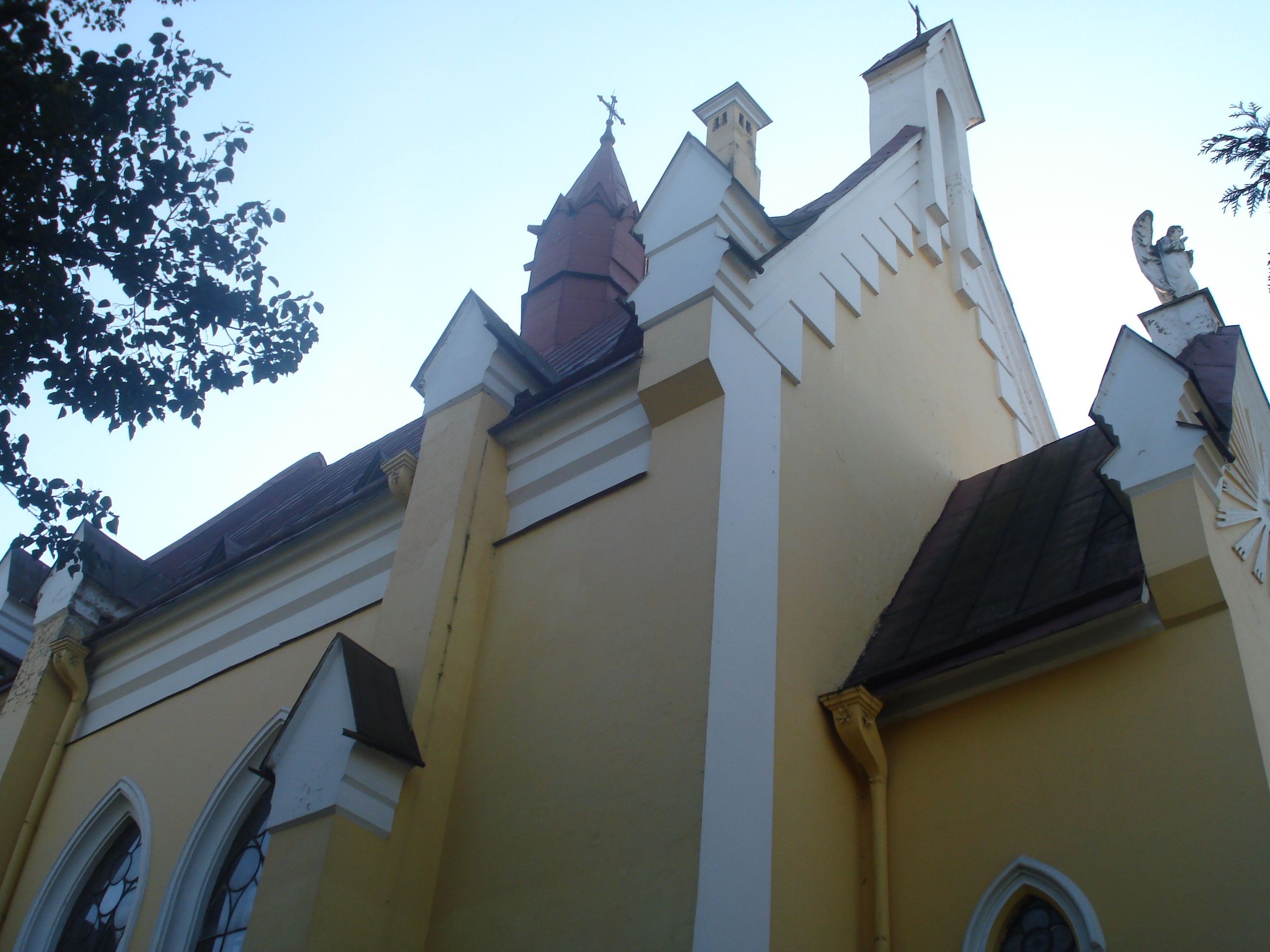

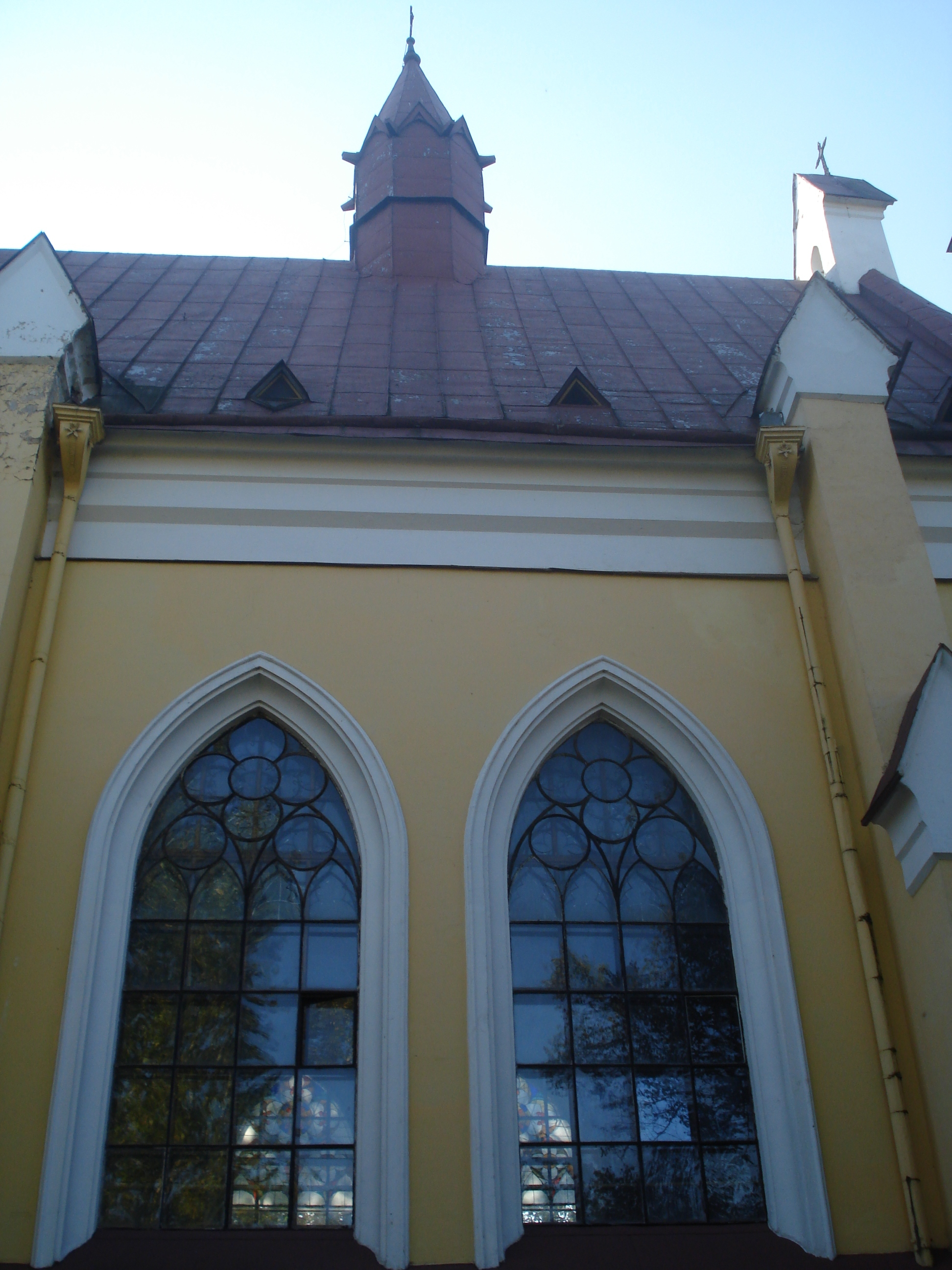

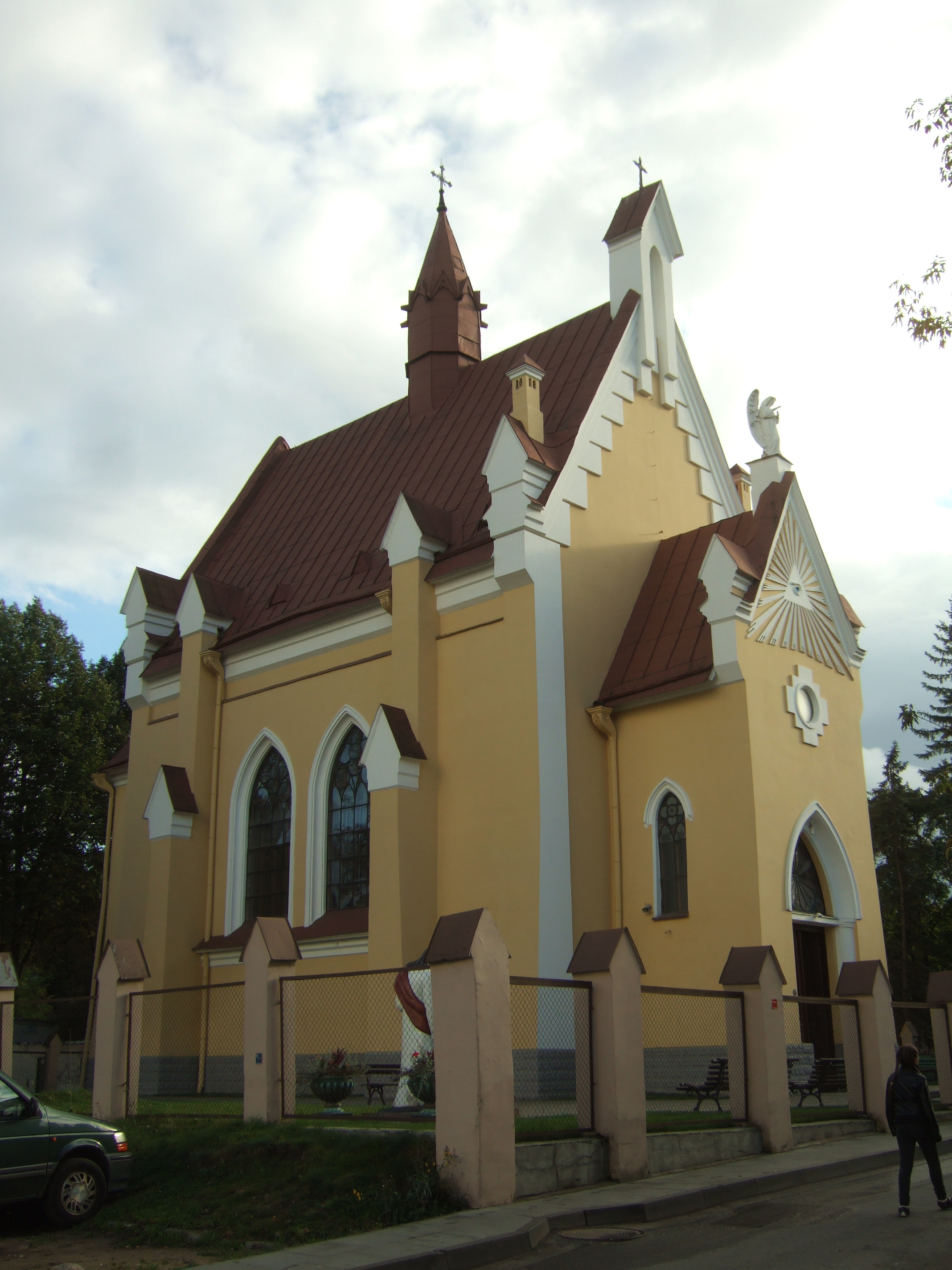

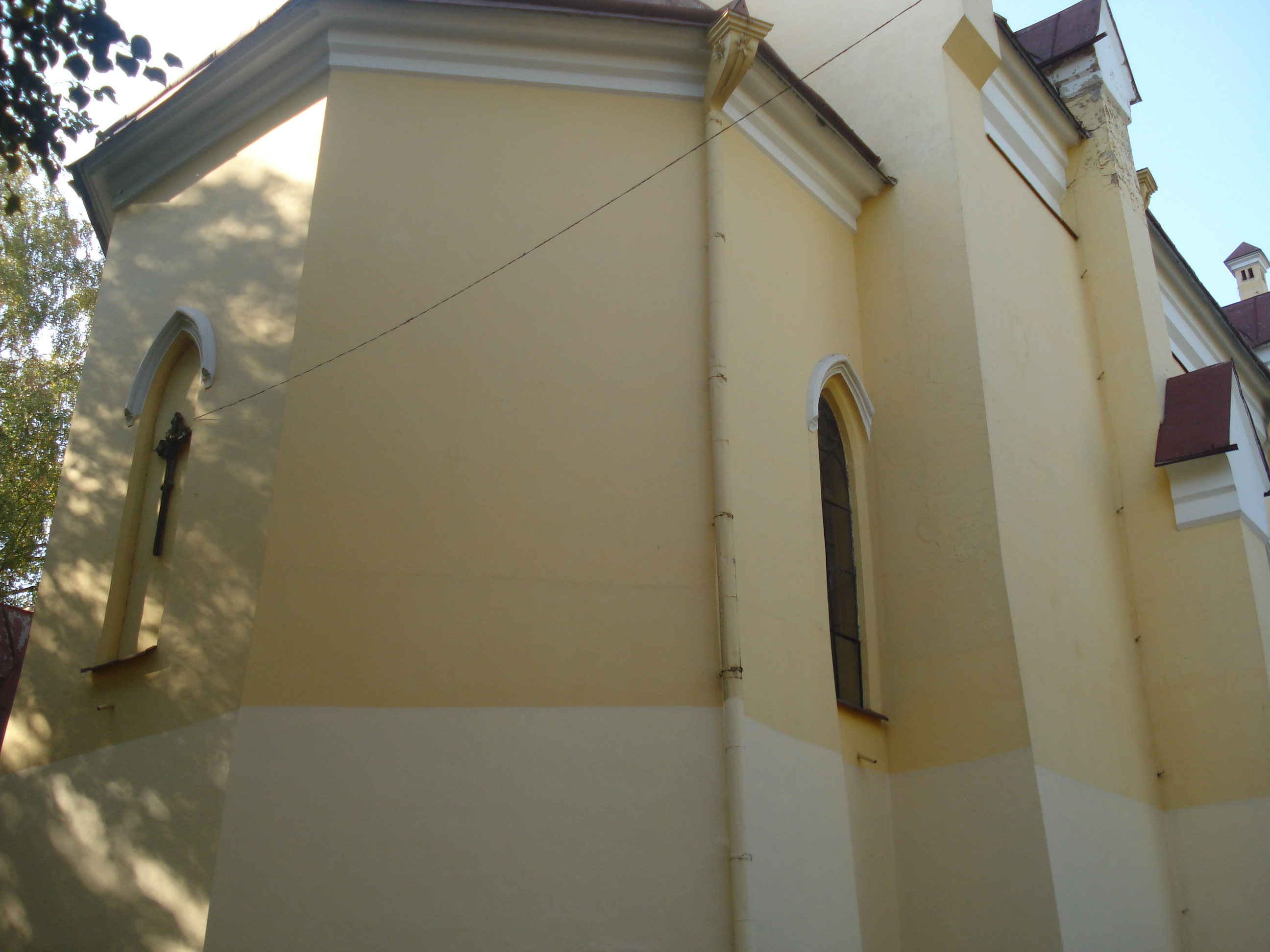

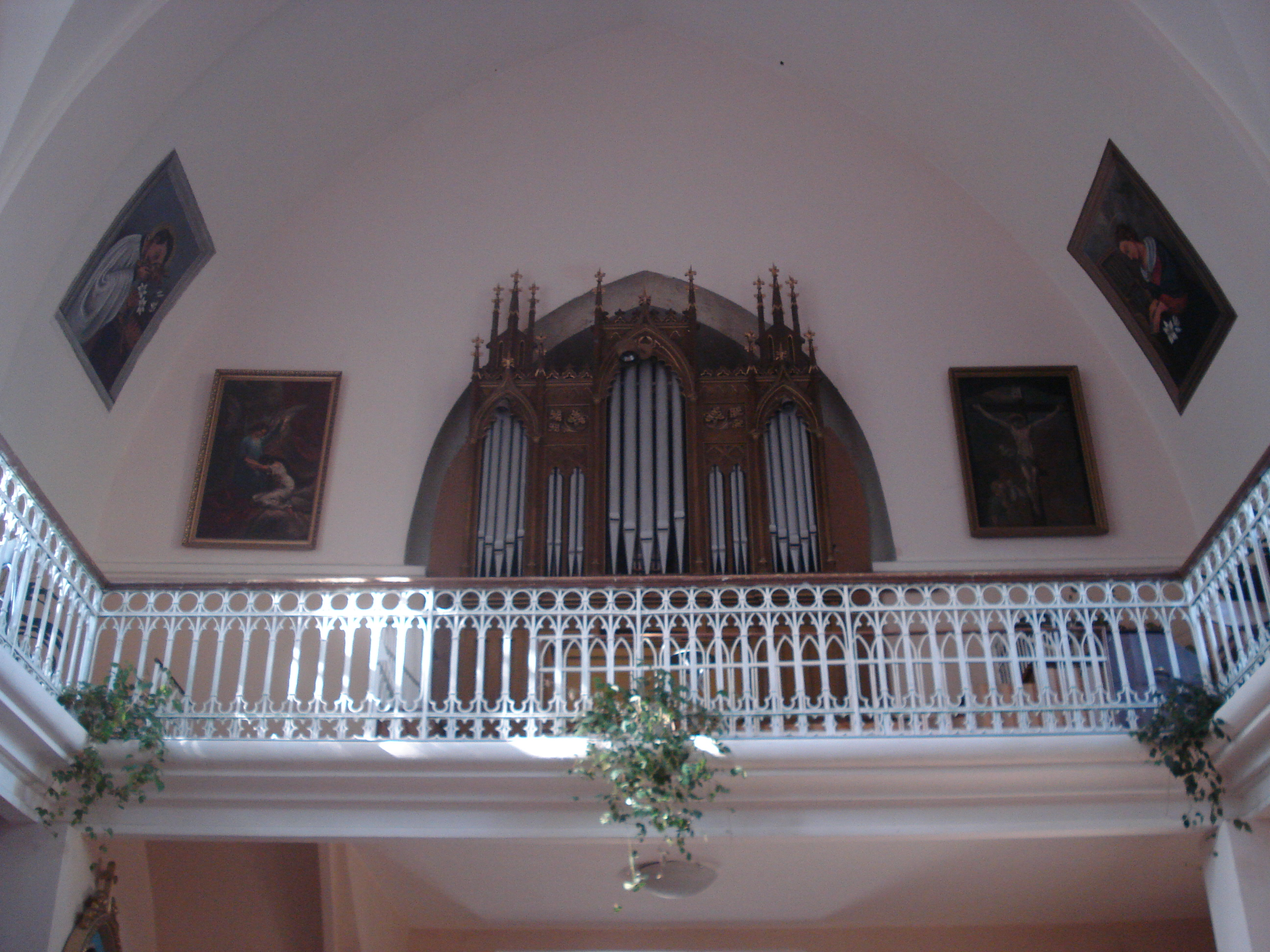

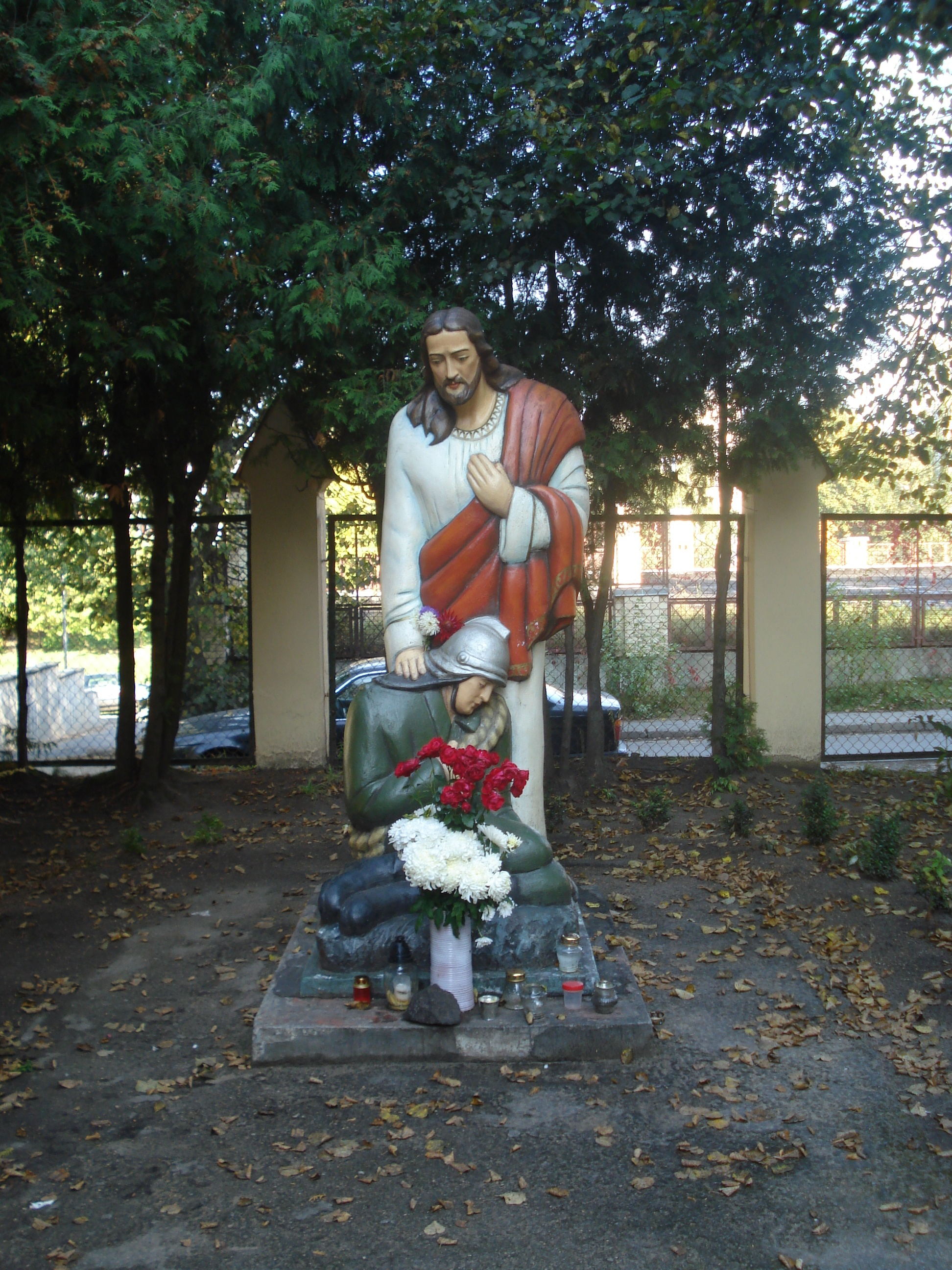

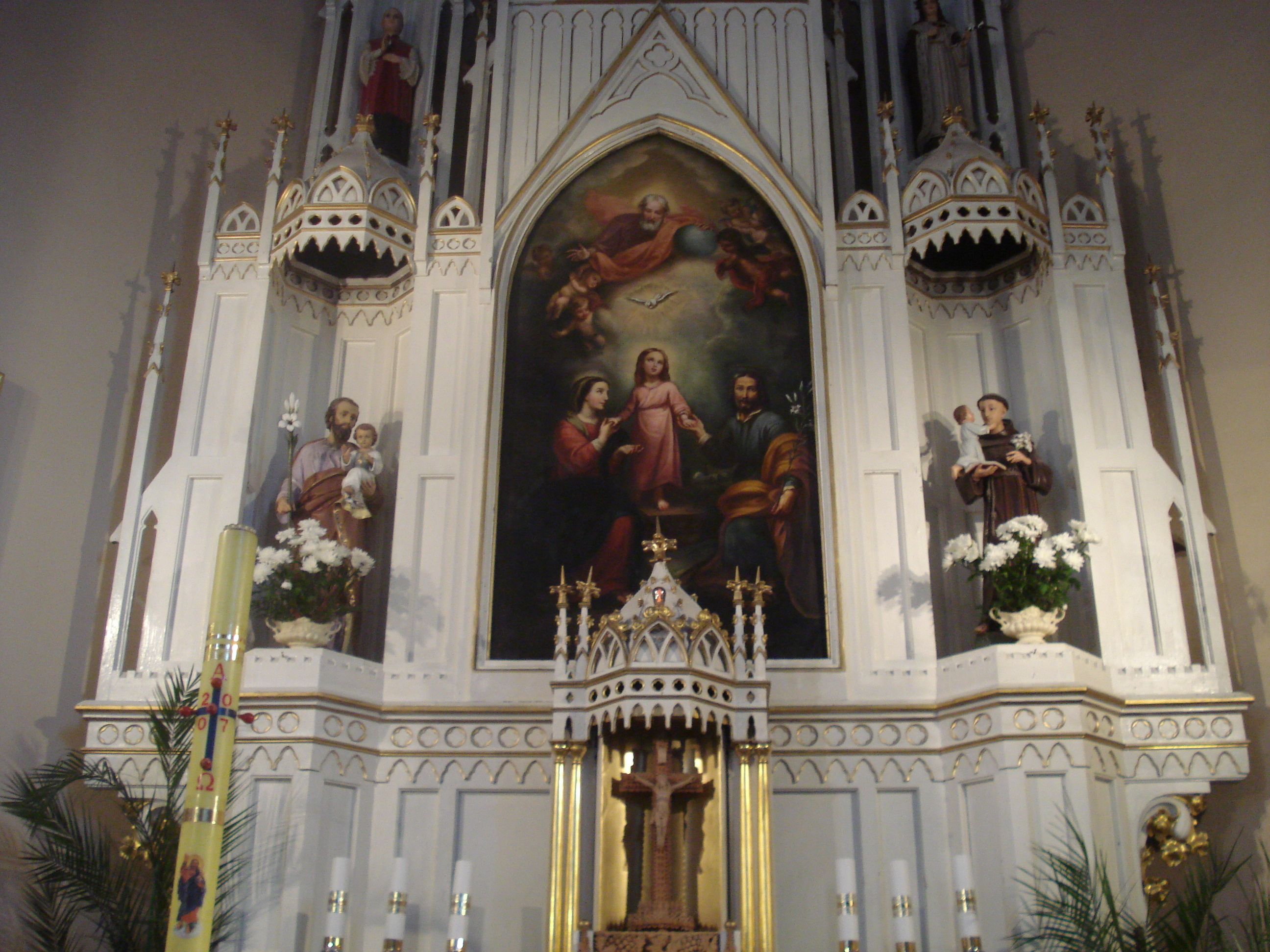

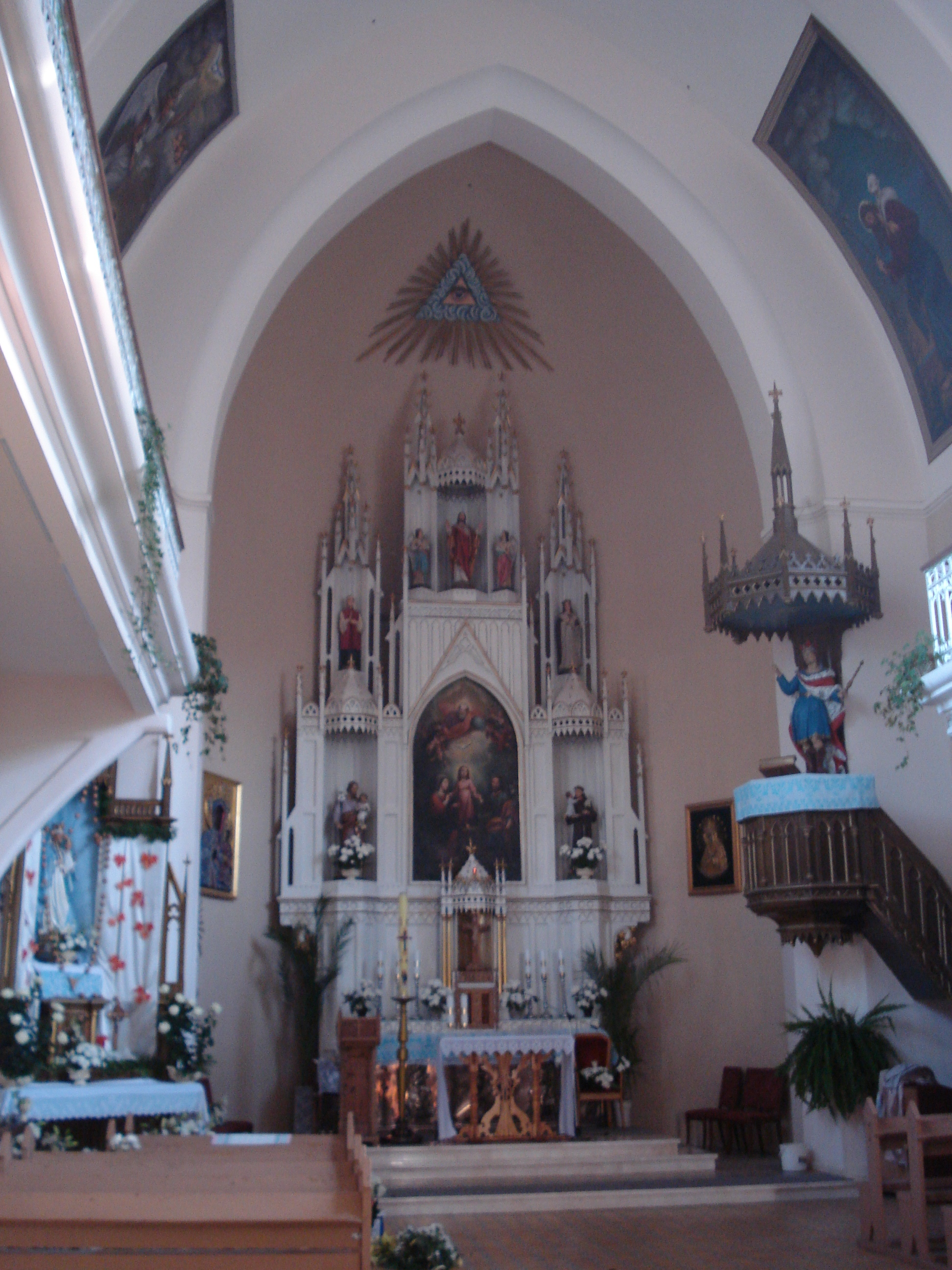

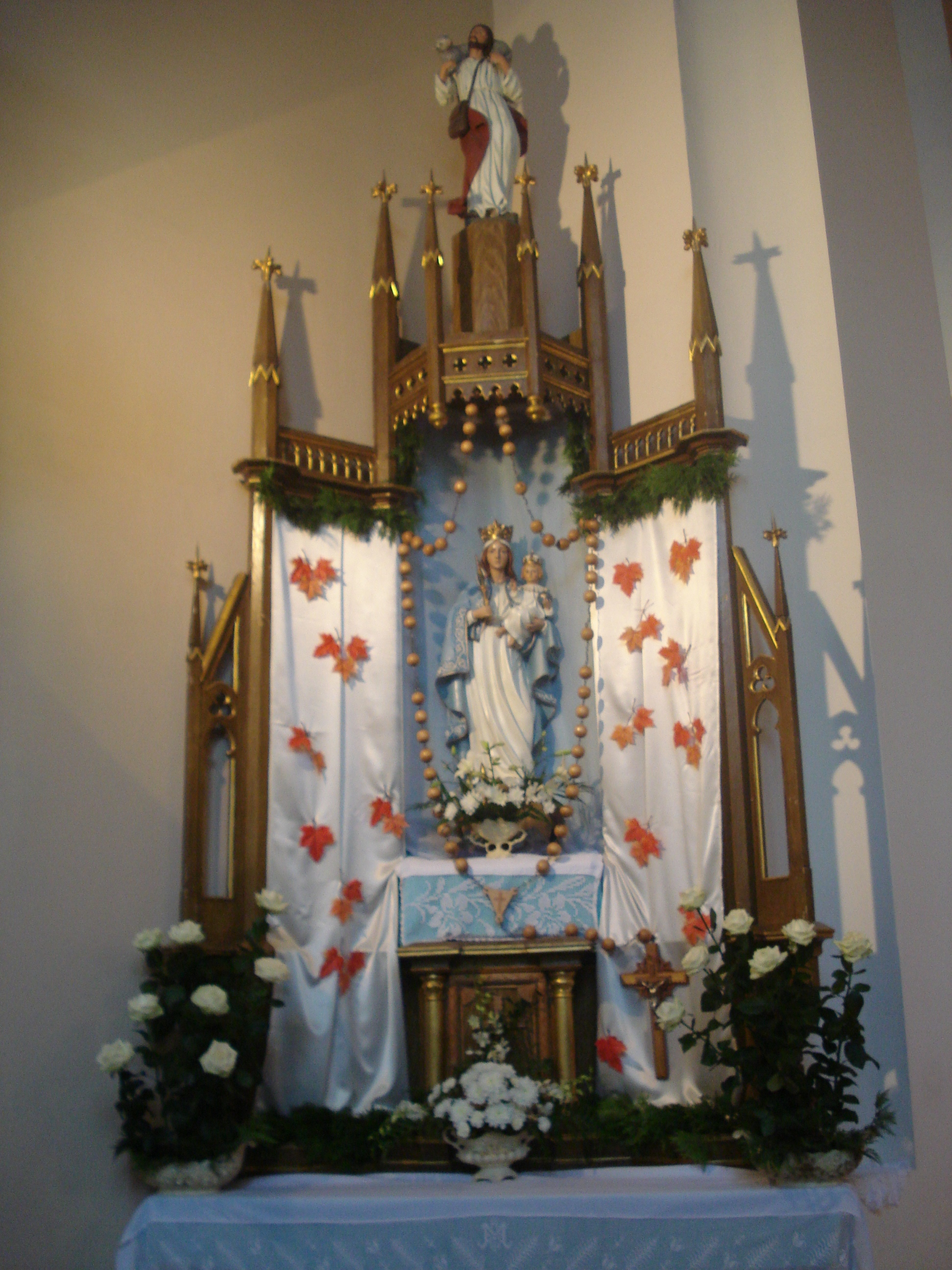

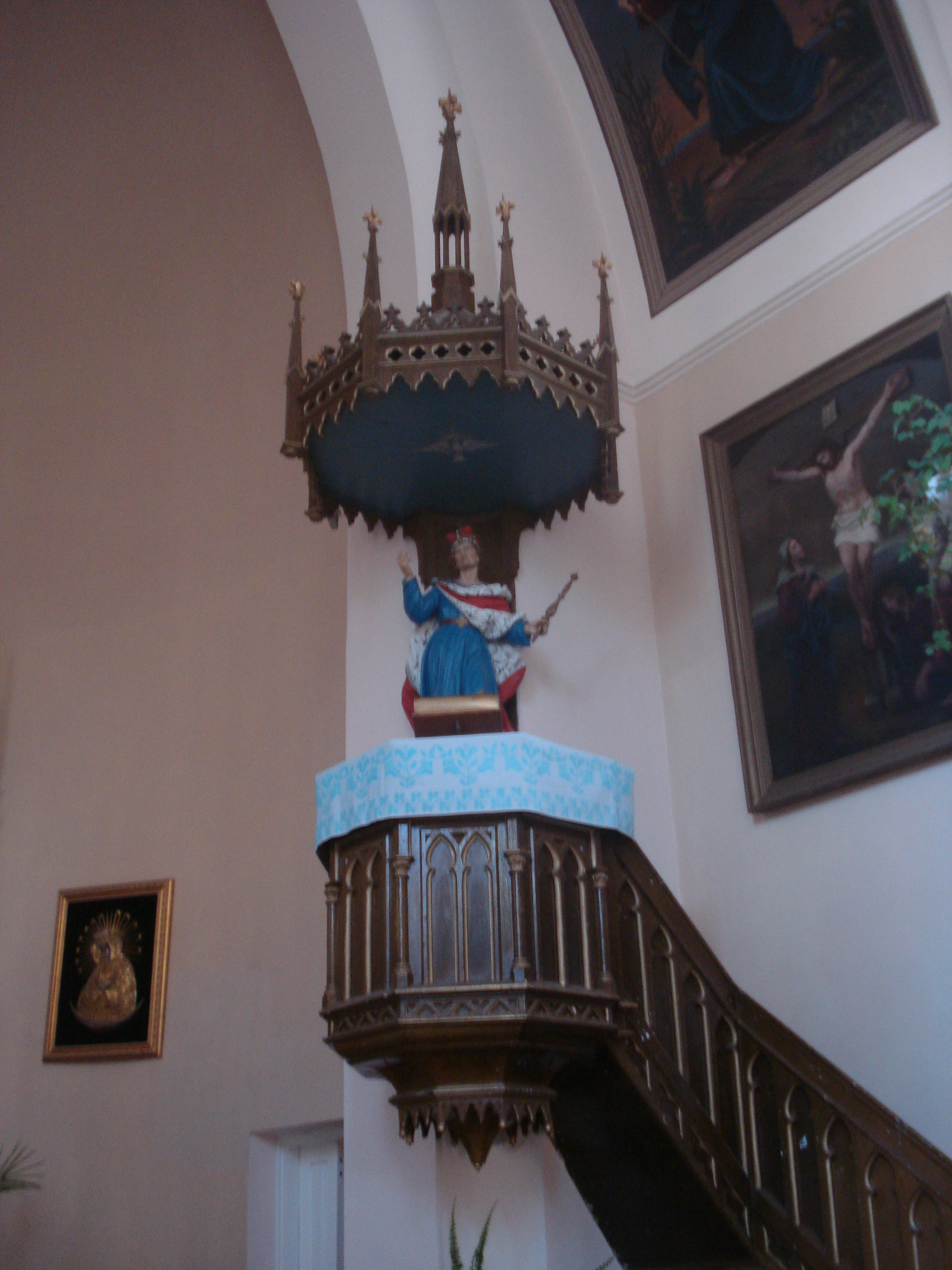
