= Erika Petunovienė =

Lithuanian painter

Erika Petunovienė (born Erica Aytė in Vilnius, Lithuania on 3 March 1983), is a contemporary painter.

== Biography ==
Erika Petunovienė (Erica AYTE), studied at Lithuanian University of Educational Sciences in Lithuania, at the Institute of Culture and Art Education, where obtained the Bachelor and Master degrees of Arts and Technology. Lives and creates in Vilnius.

== Style ==
Her art represents the abstract symbolist style.

== Biennales ==
- 12-th FLORENCE BIENALLE (2019-10-18 – 2019-10-27), Florence, Italy

== Diplomas ==
- Acknowledgment diploma from Vilnius City Municipality, Lazdynai eldership for organizing "Lazdynai Creators Space" and curating the exhibition;
- Acknowledgment diploma from the Association of Consolation for the kindness and support with artwork at their charity event;
- "NEXT ART WEEK IN GREECE", Myro gallery, Greece, diploma for "Avangard" nomination.

== Sources ==
- Art WORK, Kunst and Design, 2018-02
- Art WORK, Kunst and Design, about Exhibition ART STAGES, 2018-03
- dailininkei-erikai-petunovienei/ Interview, 2018-04, LT life
- grozis/170950 Austėja Mikuckytė- Mateikienė „Art by Erika Petunovienė. Not banal goodness and beauty”; 2018-07-21, Bernardinai
- A. Mikuckytė- Mateikienė „Alytaus biennial. Young professionals“, 2018-07-11, Bernardinai
- A. Mikuckytė- Mateikienė, „Erikos Petunovienės look at the M.K. Čiurlionis art by her brushes“, 2018-08, Čiurlionio fondas
- Exhibition of painter Erika Petunovienė “Color Music“, 2018-09 Music gallery
- Gabrielė Kuizinaitė, Gytis Oržikauskas „Artist Erika Petunovienės exhibition: art and music synergy in paintings“, 2018-10, Culture bridges
- Erikos Petunovienės personal exhibition „deTALES“, 2018-10, Mokslo Lietuva
- Gytis Oržikauskas „Erikos Petunovienės personal exhibition „deTALES“, 2018-11-02, magazine 7 MD/ 7 ART DAYS, No. 35 (1272)
- G. Oržikauskas „Tales in the language of abstract symbolism“ 2018-11, Krašto naujienos
- G. Oržikauskas „Tales in the language of abstract symbolism“ 2018-11, Etaplius
- Magazine „Lietuvė“ No.2/2018; (introduction of the artworks)
- India newspaper, interview and about art symposium, 2018-11-18.
- Vilma Kilinskienė „The birth of the world by Erika Petunoviene“, 2018-12-03, Alkas
- Art introduction
- Gytis Oržikauskas, "Unable to paint without telling story" 2019-02-28, SWO magazine
- nepapasakojusistorijos/ Gytis Oržikauskas, "Unable to paint without telling story" 2019-02-28, Alkas
- istorijos/ „Let's stop being afraid of colors“ 2019-03-03, Mėlynas šuo
- Gytis Oržikauskas „Women's touch: Erika Petunovienė- Aytė's paintings“, Culture magazine „Pašvaistė“ 2019/ No. 2, 35–38 psl.
- Bougie Art Gallery Magazine, June 2019, Issue 1.
- Exhibition and symposium: Art and nature“, 2019-06-04, Nuova Irpinia, Italy
- Exhibition „Lazdynai: Harmony of the City and Nature“, Respublika, 2019-06-01
- Exhibition „Lazdynai: Harmony of the City and Nature“, ELTA, 2019-06-01
- The exhibition annotation of the artist Erika Petunovienė “Lazdynai: Harmony of the City and Nature” will be presented in the Lithuanian Parliament in 2019. June 27 Press Releases Lithuanian Parliament
- G. Oržikauskas, Exhibition review “Lazdynai: Harmony of the City and Nature” 2019-07-03
- Exhibition review “Lazdynai: Harmony of the City and Nature” 2019-07-03
- J. Ranceviene, Creative Festival "DPoetry Source 2019", Symposium "Blue Dog" and Participants, July 17, 2019, 2019-08-04
- J. Ranceviene, Creative Festival "DPoetry Source 2019", Symposium "Blue Dog" and Participants, July 17, 2019, 2019-08-04, 15 min.lt
- . Ranceviene, Creative Festival "DPoetry Source 2019", Symposium "Blue Dog" and Participants, July 17, 2019, 2019-08-04, 15 min.lt
- G. Oržikauskas „Dichotomy of Tradition and Innovation” Exhibition Review “COLORS ON”, 2019-08-04, Krašto naujienos
- Artist Erika Petunovienė: "My Family Says I'm Born with Pencils in Hands", “PEOPLE” Magazine 2019-10-03
- About participating in the youth line auction, 2019-10-08, Lrytas
- About participating in the youth line auction, 2019-10-08, 15 min.lt
- Erika Petunovienė's idea of femininity at the Florence Biennale, 2019-11-10, Krašto žinios.lt
