= Lazdynai (inhabited locality) =

Lazdynai is a neighborhood of Vilnius, Lithuania.

Lazdynai (literally meaning "hazelnut grove") may also refer to several locations in modern Lithuania and in Lithuanian history:

- A former name of Krasnoznamensk, Kaliningrad Oblast, previously in Lithuania Minor/East Prussia
- Lazdynai (Elektrėnai), village in Elektrėnai municipality, Lithuania
- Lazdynai (Jonava), village in Jonava district, Lithuania
- Lazdynai (Kelmė), village in Kelmė district, Lithuania
- Lazdynai (Zarasai), village in Zarasai district, Lithuania
