= Neighborhoods of Vilnius =

Neighborhoods of Vilnius (Lithuanian: Vilniaus seniūnijos) are administrative districts of Vilnius City Municipality.

== List ==
Elderships, a statewide administrative division, function as municipal districts. The 21 elderships are based on neighbourhoods:

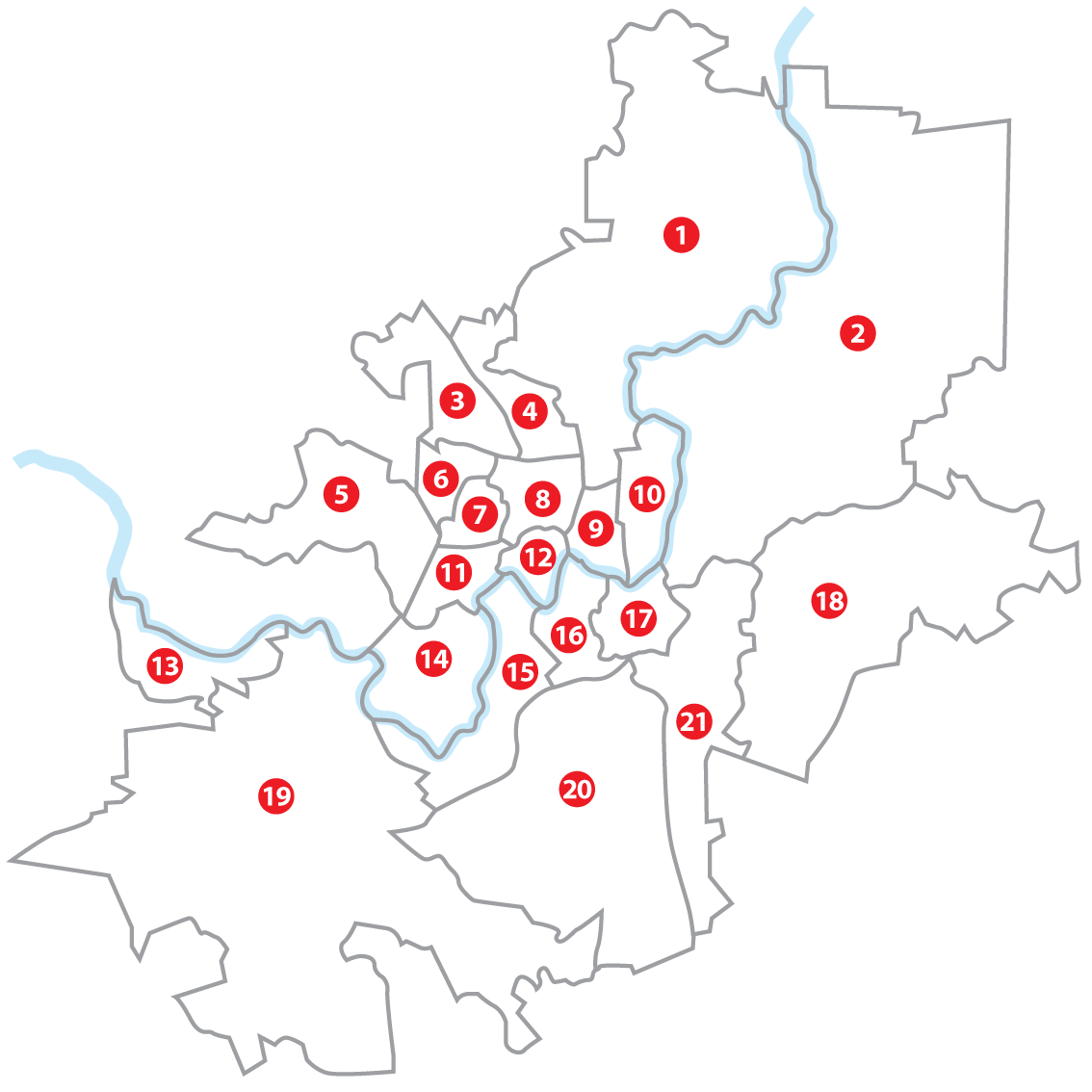
Map of Vilnius neighborhoods. Numbers on the map correspond with numbers in the list

	Neighborhoods	Area (km^{2})	Pop. (2001)	Density (2001)	Latitude	Longitude
1	Verkiai	56.0	30,856	551.0	54.708707	25.284686
2	Antakalnis	77.2	39,697	514.2	54.701126	25.308957
3	Pašilaičiai	7.9	25,674	3,249.9	54.725942	25.231328
4	Fabijoniškės	5.9	36,644	6,210.8	54.723397	25.249529
5	Pilaitė	13.9	15,996	1,150.8	54.708126	25.175803
6	Justiniškės	3.0	30,958	10,319.3	54.717905	25.220236
7	Viršuliškės	2.6	16,250	6,250.0	54.717867	25.220222
8	Šeškinė	4.6	36,604	7,957.4	54.715694	25.244574
9	Šnipiškės	3.1	19,321	6,232.6	54.692956	25.285007
10	Žirmūnai	5.7	47,410	8,317.5	54.723249	25.297213
11	Karoliniškės	3.7	31,175	8,425.7	54.685131	25.205156
12	Žvėrynas	2.6	12,188	4,687.7	54.693353	25.250209
13	Grigiškės	7.0	11,617	1,659.6	54.676897	25.081592
14	Lazdynai	9.9	32,164	3,248.9	54.674992	25.202004
15	Vilkpėdė	10.8	24,749	2,291.6	54.671995	25.243926
16	Naujamiestis	4.9	27,892	5,692.2	54.685457	25.28465
17	Senamiestis	4.4	21,022	4,777.7	54.685443	25.284621
18	Naujoji Vilnia	38.6	32,775	849.1	54.690446	25.41279
19	Paneriai	84.8	8,909	105.1	54.630048	25.105357
20	Naujininkai	37.6	33,457	889.8	54.660416	25.272415
21	Rasos	16.3	13,054	800.9	54.677718	25.281702
