= MO Museum =

Modern art museum in Vilnius, Lithuania

- MO muziejus
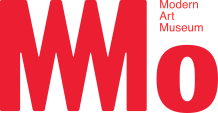

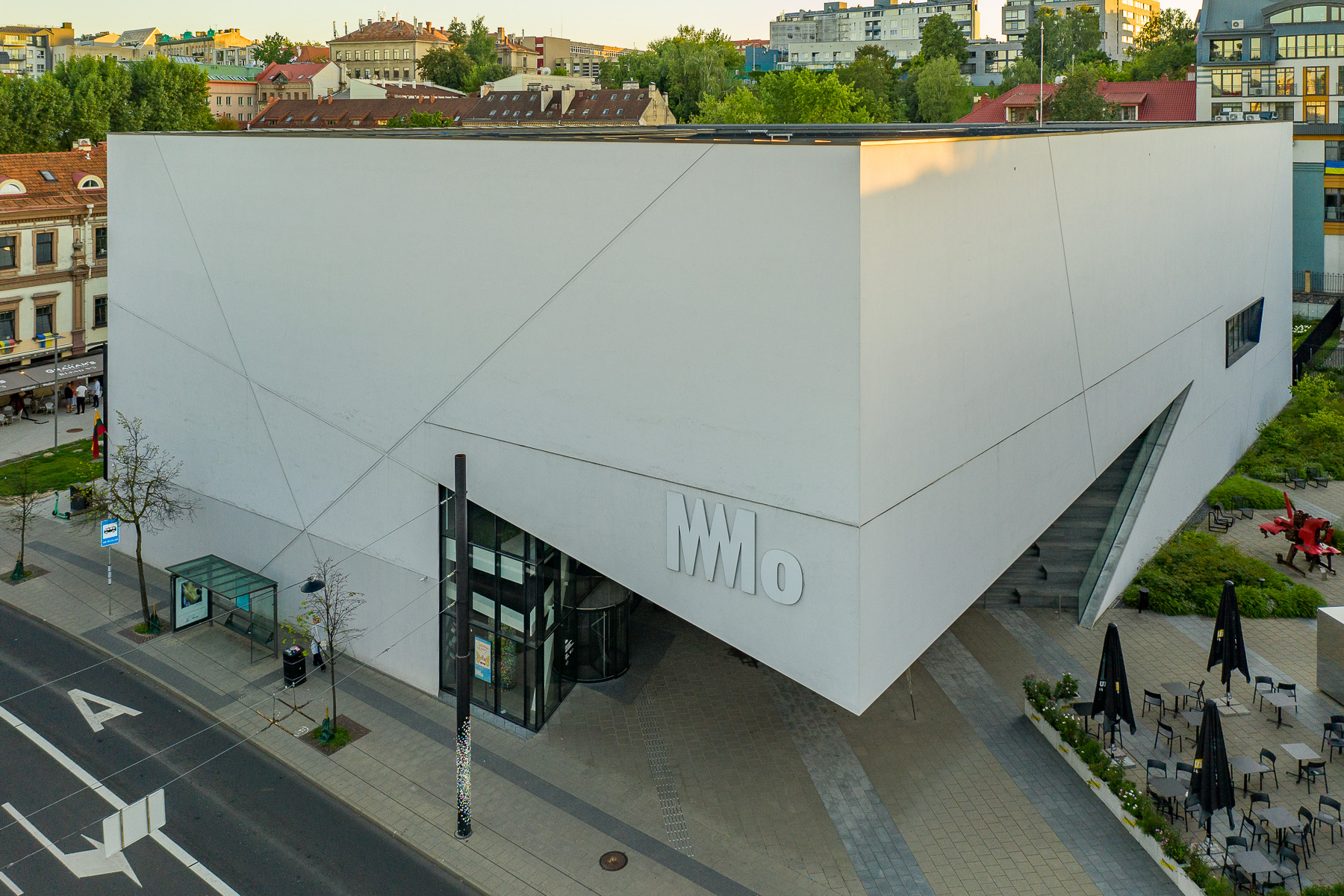
- Established: 18 October 2018; 7 years ago
- Location: Pylimo str. 17, Vilnius, Lithuania
- Coordinates: 54.679470°N 25.277744°E
- Type: Art museum
- Collection size: 6,000+
- Director: Milda Ivanauskienė
- Architects: Studio Libeskind and Do Architects
- Website: www.mo.lt

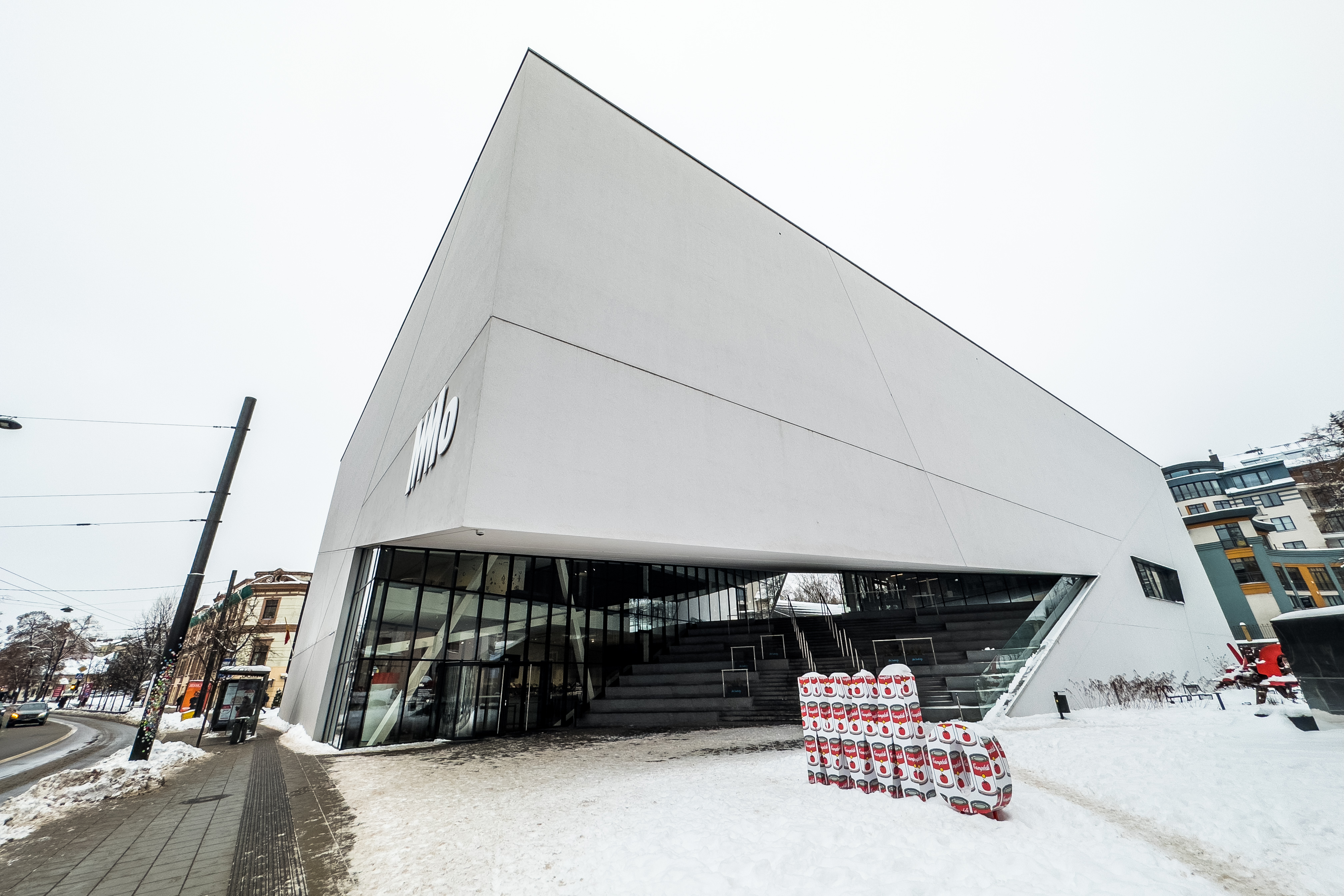
2022

The MO Museum (Lithuanian: MO muziejus) is a modern art museum in Vilnius, Lithuania. As a private initiative of Lithuanian scientists and philanthropists Danguolė Butkienė and Viktoras Butkus, it functioned as an art museum without walls for about ten years. The collection of 6,000 modern and contemporary pieces contains major Lithuanian artworks from the 1950s to the present day.

The museum was opened to the public on 18 October 2018 in the building designed by Studio Libeskind and Do Architects studio. Total building floor area: 3100 sq.m., height: 17 m. Architect Daniel Libeskind commented that although it is his smallest project, it is also one of his favorites, and he also noted that he used circular form in it for the first time (spiral staircase in the interior). Italian news agency ANSA included Mo Museum into Top 10 21st century museums to visit. The museum hosts numerous exhibitions, film screenings, educational workshops, concerts and other cultural events, which are intended for various age groups.

== History ==
=== Foundation ===
MO began its work in 2008, when the founders of the museum Viktoras and Danguolė Butkai started their own art collection. Art expert Raminta Jurėnaitė and other art critics agreed to assist with the collection of Lithuanian artworks dating from the 1960s to the present. The MO's collection is distinguished through its reflection of Lithuanian cultural modernization at the beginning of 1960s as well as the slow but continuing cultural liberation, which began after the end of the Stalin era.

The Modern Art Centre (MMC) was founded in 2009 with the intention to open a museum in the future. The active collection of artworks, organized by the MMC, received more attention from the public, which helped raise the interest of collectors and thus assisted in the creation of an art market and the recovery of the arts field in Lithuania.

MMC was orientated not only towards the collection of artworks but also towards education. For this reason, they started publishing art books with the intention to contribute to the Lithuanian education system. Many books on artists and art history by exceptional foreign writers were chosen and published for children. Published books also included translated books for youth and adults as well as albums of great Lithuanian paintings by modernists Arvydas Šaltenis and Kostas Dereškevičius. Later books in MO's collection as well as graphic artworks were published. By the time the MO Museum opened in 2018, the MMC had published over 30 art books for children and adults.

The construction of the MO Museum, which was funded by Viktoras and Danguolė Butkai, began in the location of the Lietuva Cinema in April 2017. It was the first cultural patronage project of such a large scale in the independent Lithuania as well as the only private museum of its size.

=== Impact on contemporary Lithuanian art ===
MO Museum's collection is one of the largest private collections in Lithuania, which was announced to be of national significance in 2011. The core of the collection are large sets of painting, graphic, photography and video artworks with additional sets of sculpture and interdisciplinary (performance, installation, etc.) artworks. This collection and its context is the base of Lithuanian modern and contemporary art development.

A part of MO's collection is art that was ideologically rejected during the Soviet times and received no attention from the museums in Lithuania because of the political views at that time. The collection introduces those artists who started creating after Lithuania had restored its independence as well.

=== History of Culture ===
A new project, History of Culture, was launched in 2011 in order to offer a better understanding of the context of MO's art collection. The main aim of the project is to educate and introduce the public to the Lithuanian cultural field. It also encourages new research as well as the publication of new, specialised art writings.

Eleven different forms of culture are thoroughly introduced in the online page of History of Culture: fine art, literature, theatre, applied arts, scenography, dance, design, architecture, photography, film and music.

== Architecture of MO Museum ==
The building, which MO Museum is situated in, was designed by a well-known American architect Daniel Libeskind. The greatest works of his include: the Jewish Museum in Berlin, Denver Art Museum, Contemporary Jewish Museum in San Francisco, Museum of Military History in Dresden and others. D. Libeskind is also the head architect of the rebuilt One World Trade Center.

The design project of MO Museum building was implemented in partnership with “Studio Libeskind”, which is a renowned architecture studio, as well as Lithuanian architecture studio Do Architects. This project was the first one in collaboration with “Studio Libeskind” in the Baltic states.

The main aim of building MO Museum was to establish symbolic cultural gates that lead from the medieval Old Town to the modern New Town of 18th century. MO Museum also revived one of the culturally iconic spaces of Vilnius, in which Lietuva Cinema was situated.

Demolition of Lietuva Cinema was started in February 2017. Construction of MO Museum was started later that same year with a symbolic act of a time capsule being buried under the museum.

The entrance hall with an events hall, the gift shop as well as the restaurant MO Bistro are located on the first floor, the small exhibition room as well as the reading room on the second floor while the main exhibition room is located on the third floor. One of the most important architectural details of the museum is the spiral staircase, which often tends to be captured by various photographers as well as links the museum with the past experiences of its founders.

The sculpture garden as well as the terrace are located next to the museum and are always open to the public.

== Art collection ==
The collection of the Mo Museum is composed of work by numerous Lithuanian and local modern artists, dated from 1960s and the period of “thaw” to the present day and the culture of independent Lithuania.

=== Painting ===
The core of the collection is painting, which consists of works by approximately 250 artists. The collection dates back to the modern interwar period and consists of works by modern interwar painters such as Antanas Gudaitis, Leonas Katinas, and Algirdas Petrulis. It goes on to showcase the counter-social-realist, colorful, expressive and decorative painting of 1970s creators such as Jonas Švažas, Vincas Kisarauskas, Vincentas Gečoir and others. Artworks of the 1980s follow, with neo-expressionist painting of artists such as Antanas Martinaitis, Algimantas Jonas Kuras, Kostas Dereškevičius and others. The collection also includes work of Stasys Eidrigevičius, also abstract painting, with works by Linas Katinas, Eugenijus Cukermanas and Laima Drazdauskaitė. The Mo Museum holds pieces of 1990s’ neo-expressionists Alfonsas Vilpišauskas, Arūnas Vaitkūnas, Jonas Gasiūnas, and others. Artworks created within the past two decades include works in categories that include expressionist, by Alonas Štelmanas; realistic, by Jovita Aukštikalnytė; neoromantic, by Patricija Jurkšaitytė and Eglė Gineitytė; neo-academicist, by Paulius Juška and Žygimantas Augustinas; and conceptual variations of realism by Eglė Ridikaitė and Agnė Jonkutė.

=== Graphics and photography ===
Graphic art as well as photography that form a part of MO's collection date from the 1960s to works of the present day. The collection includes the humanist works of school photographers Antanas Sutkus, Aleksandras Macijauskas, Romualdas Rakauskas, while Alfonsas Budvytis and Vytautas Balčytis are representatives of later generations.

=== Video art ===
The collection of video art contains documentary works made while using strategies of social studies (Artūras Raila, Robertas Antinis), as well as expressions of individual surrealist reality (Jurga Barilaitė, Evaldas Jansas, Svajonė and Paulius Stanikai).

=== Sculpture ===
Numerous pieces of sculpture and objects are part of the museum's sculpture holdings. It includes works by Petras Mazūra, Mindaugas Navakas and Gediminas Akstinas.

=== Young artists ===
The collection also contains works made by artists of the young generation (Andrius Zakarauskas, Linas Jusionis, Adomas Danusevičius, Eglė Karpavičiūtė, Monika Furmanavičiūtė, Leonid Alekseiko and others). These have received positive comments from the public and approval from numerous art critics.

Presentation and publicity of the artworks is a priority of the MO Museum. Therefore, interviews are often conducted with the artists, and audioguides are created and recorded.

== Projects ==
=== Literatų Street ===
The project of Literatų Street was implemented in partnership with curator Eglė Vertelkaitė as well as over 100 different artists in the Old Town of Vilnius. More than 200 plates, made by different artists, were installed on the wall of Literatų Street to represent the wide prospect of Lithuanian literature. More information on the project and its artists' works can be found in a book Literatų street. Kuktūrinis gidas (2014), which was compiled and written by Milda Ivanauskienė, the director of MO Museum.

=== Vilniaus Talking Statues ===
MO Museum released a cultural guide The Path of Vilnius Statues to help the public get to know the capital through introduction to sculptures and monuments of Vilnius. The idea was renewed in 2015 by introducing a project Vilnius Talking Statues, when 15 of local statues were made interactive. This way Vilnius became the fourth city in the international project, amongst other world's megalopolises such as New York or Copenhagen. Audios’ texts on sculptures were written by famous Lithuanian writers and red to record by professional actors.

=== The History of Culture ===
Project The History of Culture included history on modernization of Lithuanian art, photography, scenography, literature, film, music and other fields of culture, was introduced in 2010. The unique archive of Lithuanian culture history was prepared in partnership with Lithuanian art critics, historians and theorists of culture, architecture and literature. This project is designated to be of use not only for researchers of various fields of culture but for teachers, students and pupils as well.

=== Laboratory of Art ===
Dedicated for management of personnel, Laboratory of Art was implemented in collaboration with a modern biotechnology company “Thermo Fisher Scientific Baltics” in 2016. Participants visited workspaces of the artists, attended creative workshops prepared by art critics, were introduced to the specifics of MO Museum's vaults. 3 month-long partnership with Thermo Fisher Scientific Baltics resulted in an exhibition “Bridges”, which was curated by 16 scientists from various fields such as scientific research, manufacture and administration.

=== Travelling museum ===
The team of MO Museum visited over a couple of tens of schools and communities in Vilnius with the project “Travelling museum” in 2010. They attempted to achieve a different point of view towards creativity, arts education as well as the relationship between arts world and the lifestyle of people. The team conducted numerous lessons and meetings during which the participants were able to get to know the Lithuanian culture in non-traditional forms and ways.
