= Svencelė oil field =

Oil field in Lithuania

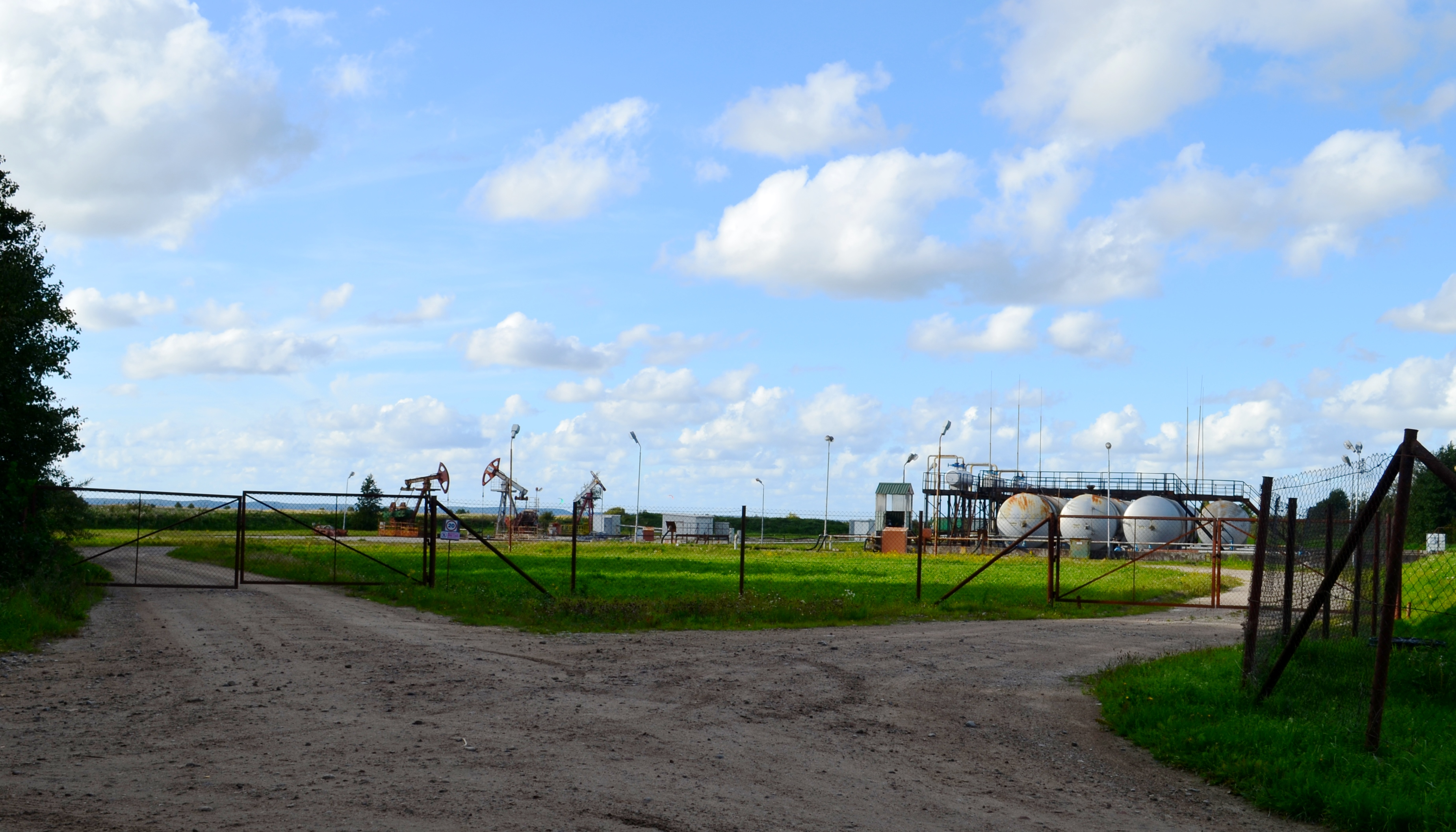
- Svencelė oil field infrastructure
- Country: Lithuania
- Location: Svencelė, Šilutė District Municipality
- Block: Gargždai Oil Block
- Offshore/onshore: onshore
- Coordinates: 55°28′6″N 21°15′36″E
- Operator: Minijos nafta

Field history
- Start of production: 1977

The Svencelė oil field, also known as the Sakučiai-5 oil field, is an oil field in the Gargždai Oil Block, Klaipėda District Municipality. Svencelė oil field is located 900 m from Svencelė Swamp and peat fields and bordering Svencelė Meadows Nature Reserve in the west.

Svencelė oil field holds the official Lithuanian national record for the longest drilled oil pump, measuring 2,989 m in length.

== History ==
Svencelė oil field started production in 1977.

The Lithuanian government sold the license of Gargždai Oil Block to the Lithuanian-Danish company Minijos nafta which is currently operating the field.

== See also ==
- List of oil fields
