= Rimantas Baldišius =

Lithuanian caricaturist (1929–2020)

- Born: Rimantas Baldišius; October 13, 1955 Tomsk Oblast, USSR
- Died: September 30, 2011 (aged 55) Šiauliai, Lithuania
- Areas: Cartoonist, engineer

Rimantas Baldišius (13 October 1955 – 20 September 2011) was a Lithuanian caricaturist and engineer.

== Career ==
In 1978, Baldišius began working as an engineer at the Šiauliai Machine Tool Factory. Starting in 1985, he joined the Šiauliai branch of the Lithuanian Institute of Information and became an active participant in the Sąjūdis movement.

In 1980 and 1984, personal exhibitions of R. Baldišius' caricatures were held at the Šiauliai Engineers' House, accompanied by the publication of their catalogs.

In 1988, together with other caricaturists from Šiauliai, he initiated the international caricature exhibition on the theme of bicycles, VELOCARTOON. The first exhibition featured 500 works submitted from 11 countries. It was the first international caricature exhibition held in the former Soviet Union. The fourth and final exhibition took place in 1994.

According to Professor Vytenis Rimkus, these four exhibitions were a form of cultural resistance. Caricature joined other genres of small-scale graphics, such as ex-libris and commemorative art postcards, through which occupied Lithuania and Lithuanians asserted their presence in the world.

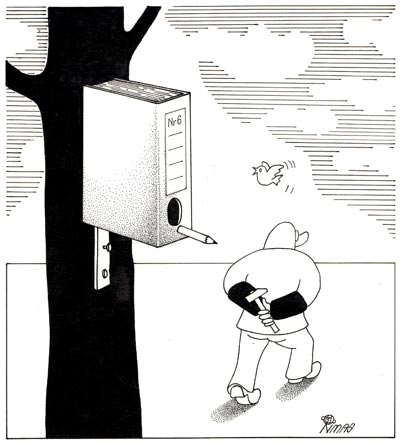
Caricature by Rimantas Baldišius

The themes of Baldišius' caricatures are diverse. The world of bureaucracy is depicted through personified desks, individuals trapped under piles of paperwork, arrows escaping from technical drawings to strike their creators, and the paradoxes of traffic signs. Professor Vytenis Rimkus observed that the artist created a uniquely distinctive caricature character—a little humanoid figure grappling with various forms of technology, such as cars, machine tools, and their components. Often, the objects of technology themselves, imbued with human-like vitality, become the protagonists of the drawings. This relationship between humans and objects creates paradoxical, illogical, and humorous situations.

From 2008 to 2009, Baldišius was the president of the Šiauliai LIONS Club.

== Personal life ==
Baldišius was born in Tomsk Oblast, USSR, to a family of deportees. The family returned to Lithuania in 1956.

Baldišius’ daughter Andrė is an architect, urban planner and entrepreneur.
