= Literatų Street =

Street in Vilnius, Lithuania

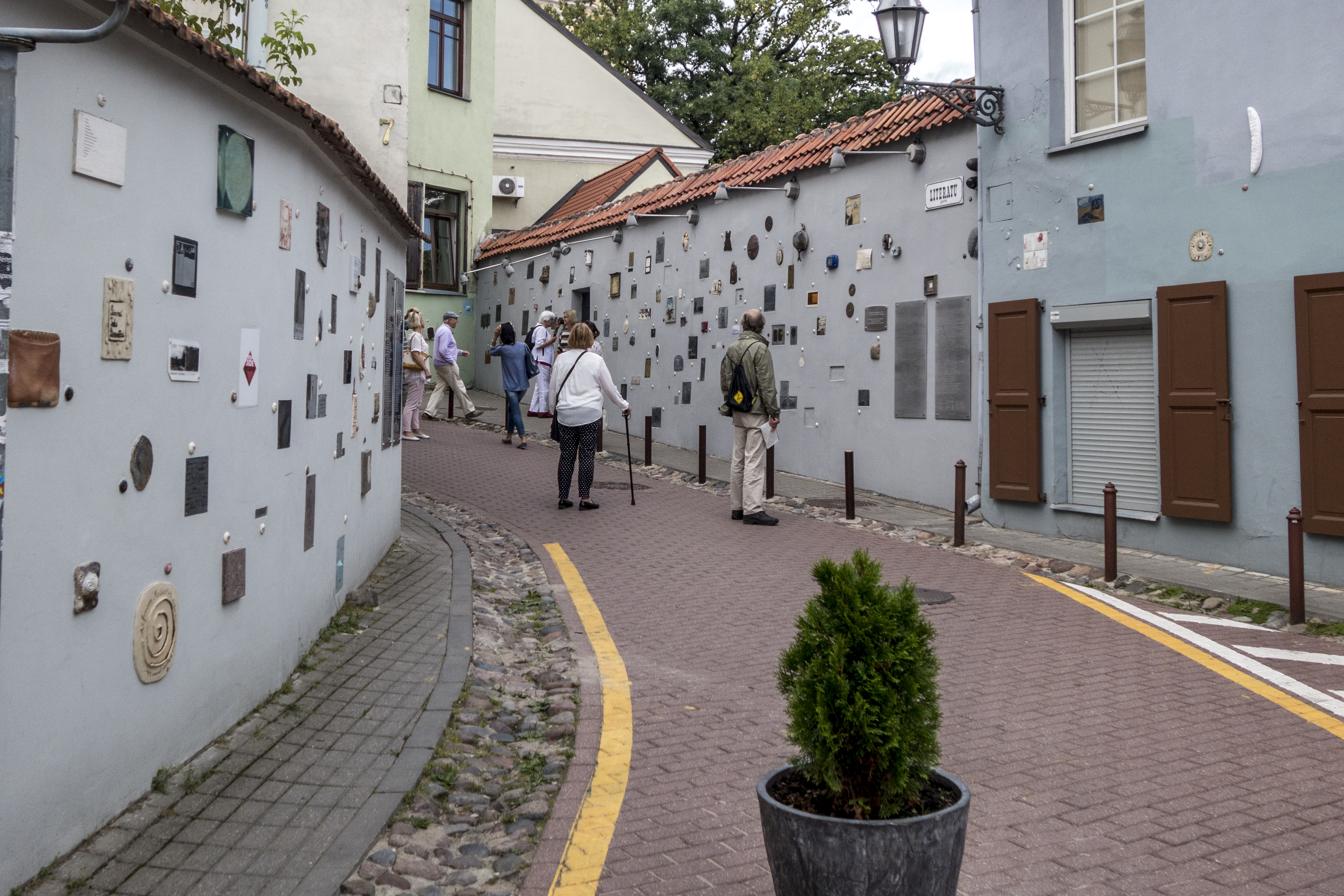
- Literatų Street with plaques on the walls
- Interactive map of Literatų Street
- Native name: Literatų gatvė (Lithuanian)
- Former name(s): St. Michael, Pokrov
- Length: 140 m (460 ft)
- Location: Vilnius, Lithuania
- Postal code: LT-01125
- Coordinates: 54°40′56″N 25°17′25″E

Literatų Street (literally: Literati Street; Lithuanian: Literatų gatvė) is one of streets in the Old Town of Vilnius, the capital of Lithuania. It is a short narrow street mostly known for public display of decorative and artistic plaques dedicated to writers who have lived and worked in Vilnius or otherwise have shared a connection with Vilnius and Lithuania. The artwork was first added in 2009 when Vilnius was designated as the European Capital of Culture and has grown to some 200 plaques.

Its name originates from the many printing houses and bookstores which were located in the street or from the fact that prominent poet Adam Mickiewicz briefly lived there in 1823.
