= Vytautas Čekanauskas =

Lithuanian architect

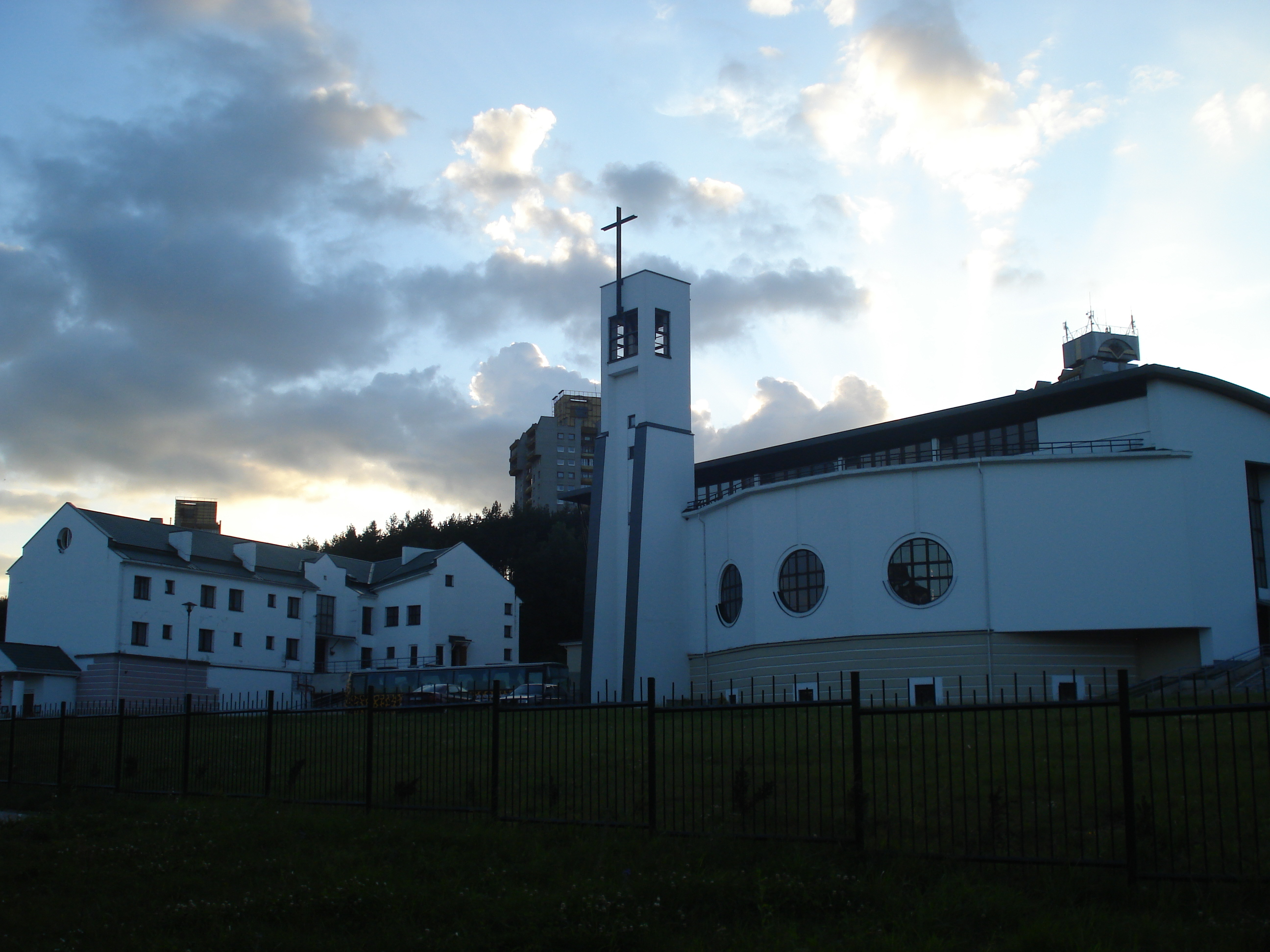
Church of St. John Bosco

Vytautas Edmundas Čekanauskas (13 May 1930, Šiauliai – 7 July 2010, Vilnius) was a Lithuanian architect, professor of the Vilnius Academy of Art.

In 1974 he, together with colleagues, was awarded the Lenin Prize in architecture for the design of Lazdynai, a residential district made up of 4 microdistricts in Vilnius.

In 2000 he was awarded the Officer's Cross of the Order of the Lithuanian Grand Duke Gediminas.

== Works ==
- Agricultural Institute in Vilnius (1971–78)
- Lazdynai parish of Vilnius
- Church of St. John Bosco, Vilnius
- Building of the Government of Lithuania
