= Gediminas Valiuškis =

Lithuanian architect

Gediminas Valiuškis (Gediminas Stanislovo Valiuškis) (born January 24, 1927, Kaunas, Lithuania – 28 April 1999, Vilnius) was a Lithuanian architect, with expertise in design of residential buildings.

Valiuškis graduated from the Vilnius Institute of Art (1946-1951). Since 1963 he was chief architect of Vilnius.

In 1974 he, together with colleagues, was awarded the Lenin Prize in architecture for the design of Lazdynai, a residential area of Vilnius.
