= List of Lithuanian architects =

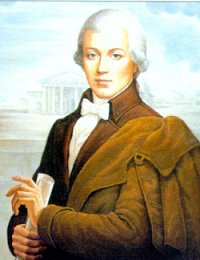
Laurynas Gucevičius, considered to be the first professional Lithuanian architect

Following is a list of notable architects from Lithuania.

== A ==
- Kęstutis Antanėlis (1951–2020)

== B ==
- Gediminas Baravykas (1940–1995)
- Edmundas Benetis (born 1953)

== Č ==
- Vytautas Čekanauskas (1930–2010)
- Nikolajus Čiaginas (1823–1909)

== D ==
- Rytis Daukantas
- Klaudijus Dušauskas (1891–1959)

== G ==
- Laurynas Gucevičius (1753–1798)

== K ==
- Algirdas Kaušpėdas (born 1953)
- Martynas Knakfusas (1740–1821)
- Alfredas Kulpa-Kulpavičius (1923–2007)

== L ==
- Kęstutis Lupeikis (born 1962)

== M ==
- Kiprijonas Maculevičius (1830–1906)

== N ==
- Algimantas Nasvytis (1928–2018)

== P ==
- Karolis Podčasinskis (1790–1860)

== V ==
- Gediminas Valiuškis (1927–1999)
- Jonas Virakas (1905–1988)
- Antanas Vivulskis (1877–1919)

== Ž ==
- Tomas Žebrauskas (1714–1758)

== See also ==
- List of architects
- List of Lithuanians
