= Lithuanian Union of Architects =

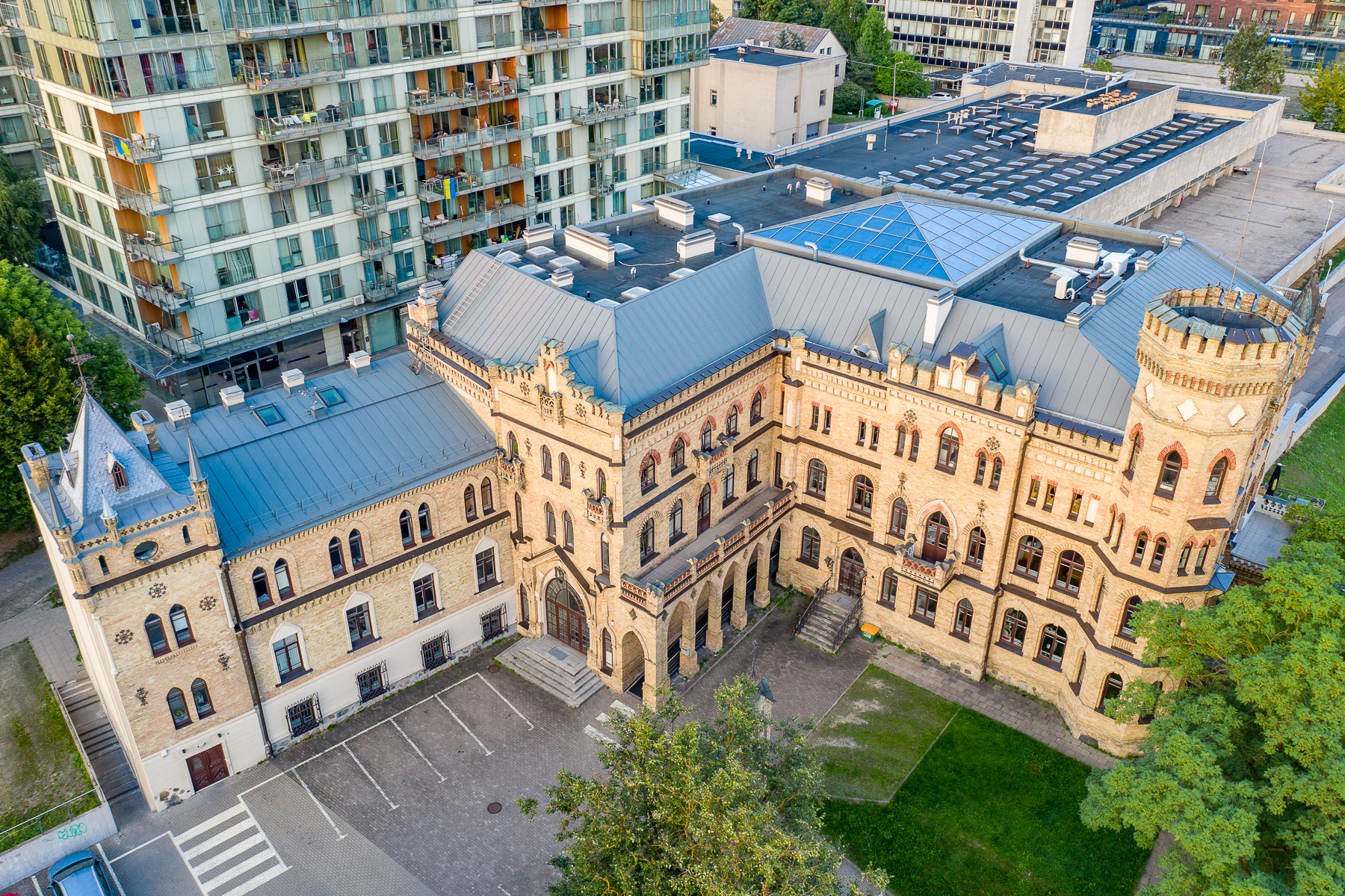
- Headquarters of the Lithuanian Union of Architects
- Abbreviation: LAS
- Formation: 1924; 102 years ago
- Type: NGO
- Legal status: Association
- Headquarters: Kalvarijų st. 1, 09310 Vilnius, Lithuania
- Location: Lithuania
- President: Gintaras Balčytis
- Affiliations: Union of International Architects (formerly)
- Website: www.architektusajunga.lt

The Lithuanian Union of Architects (Lithuanian: Lietuvos architektų sąjunga) is an independent organization with 1079 members (2008) headquartered in Vilnius. It was founded in 1924 in Kaunas. It is a member of the International Union of Architects since 1993. Its board of directors has 6 members and a president who are elected every three years during the general assembly.

== History ==
The Lithuanian Union of Architects was founded in Kaunas in 1924 under the original name of the Lithuanian Union of Engineers and Architects. In 1940, the union had to change its name to the Lithuanian Union of Soviet Architects, and in 1954 it was renamed the Lithuanian SSR Union of Architects. In that same year, the union moved to Vilnius. Since 1989, it has been known by its current name, the Lithuanian Union of Architects. It became a member of the International Union of Architects (UIA) on 17 June 1993 and of the Baltic Association of Architectural Unions (BAUA) on the same date.

On July 6th, 2023, the Lithuanian Architects' Union (LAU), together with the Latvian Association of Architects (LAA) and Union of Estonian Architects (UEA) declared its withdrawal from the Union of International Architects (UIA) in protest at the UIA's decision not to impose sanctions on Russia for its war in Ukraine.

=== Lidl scandal ===
In 2016, Lidl bought an abandoned building in the outskirts of Vilnius with intentions to build local headquarters. Soon after the purchase, Lithuanian architectural union together with Lithuania's ministry of culture declared the building ruin to be a protected Lithuanian architectural treasure freezing Lidl's plans in the process.

There have been speculations and allegations that such actions were a covert attempt to extort bribes. After a public dispute, where Lidl placed formal complaints to various branches of Lithuanian government, including to Lithuania's president, and after several rounds of legal battles, Lithuanian architectural union backed off.
