= Svencelė =

- Village
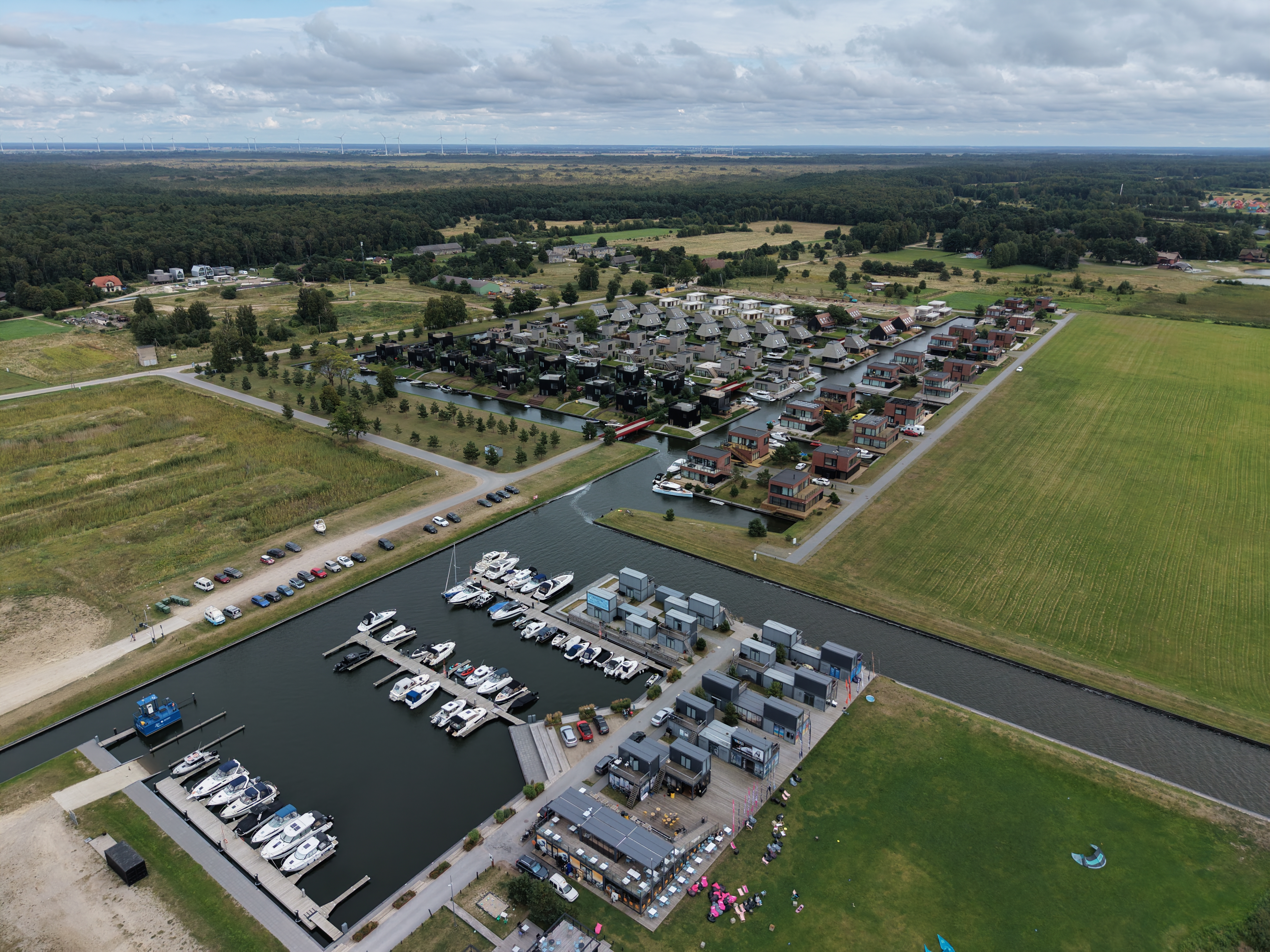
- View of Svencelė

- Location of Svencelė
- Coordinates: 55°29′38.4″N 21°15′7.2″E
- Country: Lithuania
- Ethnographic region: Lithuania Minor
- County: Klaipėda County
- Municipality: Klaipėda district municipality
- Eldership: Priekulė eldership
- First mentioned: 1509

Population (2021)
  - Total: 93
- Time zone: UTC+2 (EET)
  - Summer (DST): UTC+3 (EEST)
- Climate: Dfb

Svencelė is a village in the centre of Klaipėda County in western Lithuania, by the Curonian Lagoon. The village was part of the Klaipėda Region and the ethnographic Lithuania Minor.

== History ==
Svencelė was first mentioned in 1509.

In 1972 the nearby Svencelė oil field began production.

== Demography ==
=== Historical population ===
Historical population

Year	Pop.	±% p.a.
1871	251	—
1905	392	+1.32%
1910	383	−0.46%
1925	413	+0.50%
1959	195	−2.18%
1970	268	+2.93%

Year	Pop.	±% p.a.
1979	264	−0.17%
1989	159	−4.94%
2001	152	−0.37%
2011	113	−2.92%
2021	93	−1.93%

Source: 1902, 1923, 1959 & 1970, 1979, 1989, 2001, 2011
