= Vilkpėdė =

- Eldership
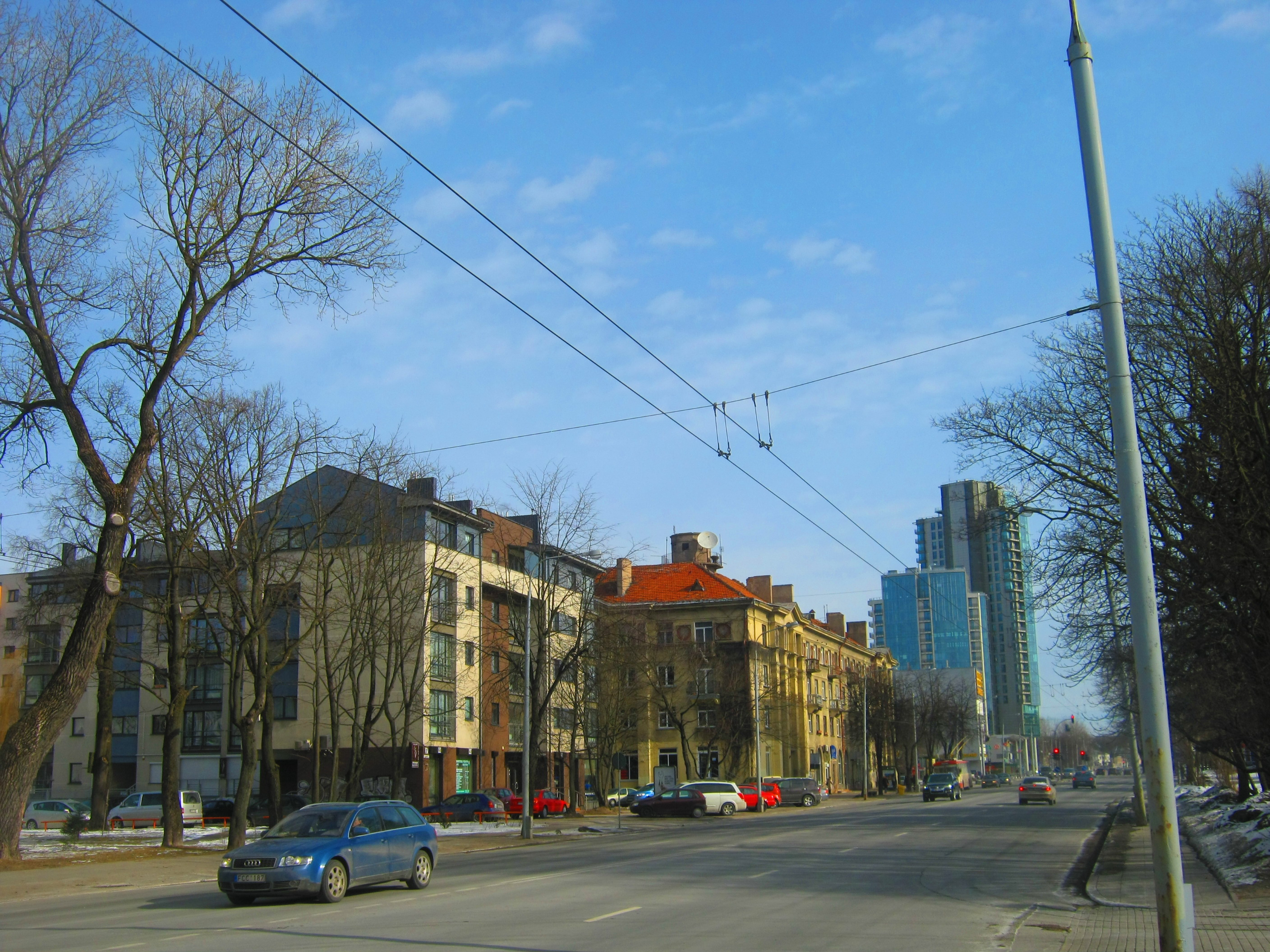
- Savanorių Avenue

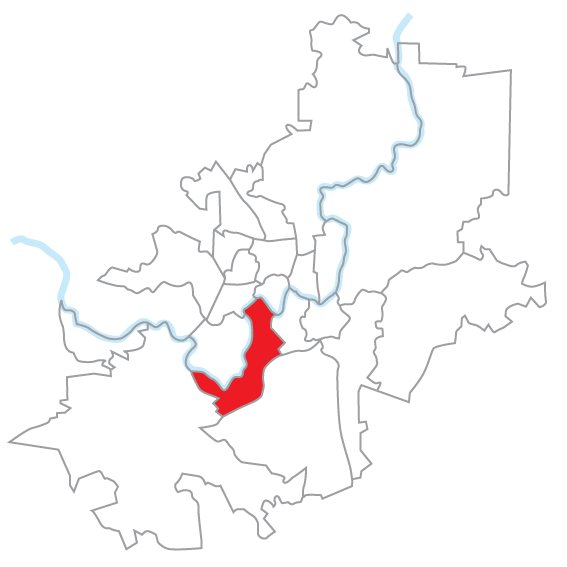
- Location in Vilnius

- Location within Lithuania
- Country: Lithuania
- County: Vilnius County
- Municipality: Vilnius city municipality

Area
  - Total: 10.8 km^{2} (4.2 sq mi)

Population (2021)
  - Total: 19,325
  - Density: 1,790/km^{2} (4,630/sq mi)
- Time zone: UTC+2 (EET)
  - Summer (DST): UTC+3 (EEST)

Vilkpėdė is an eldership in the Vilnius city municipality, Lithuania. It occupies 10,8 km^{2}. According to the 2011 census, it has a population of 21,346.

== Gallery ==
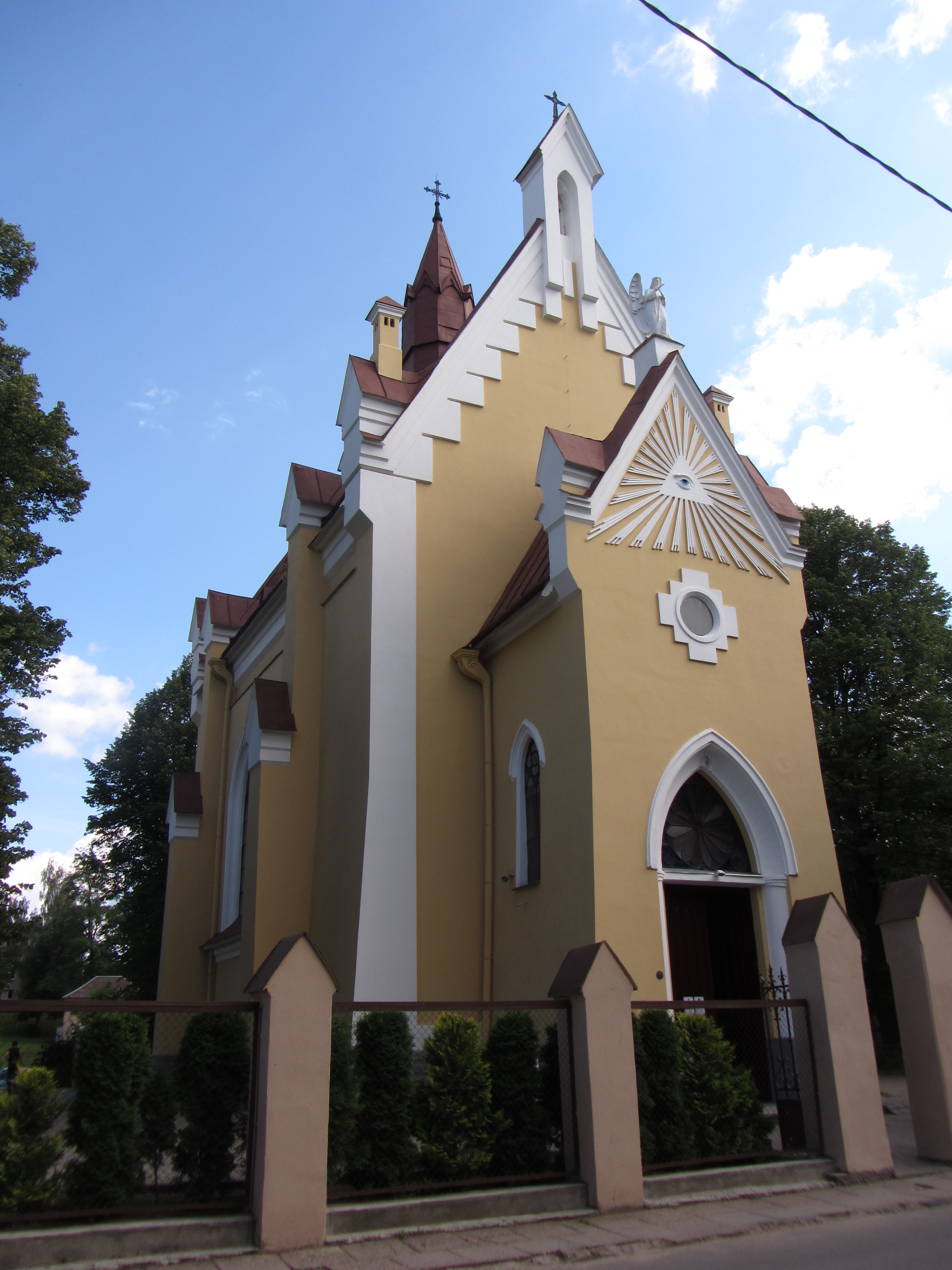
Church of the Providence of God in Vilkpėdė

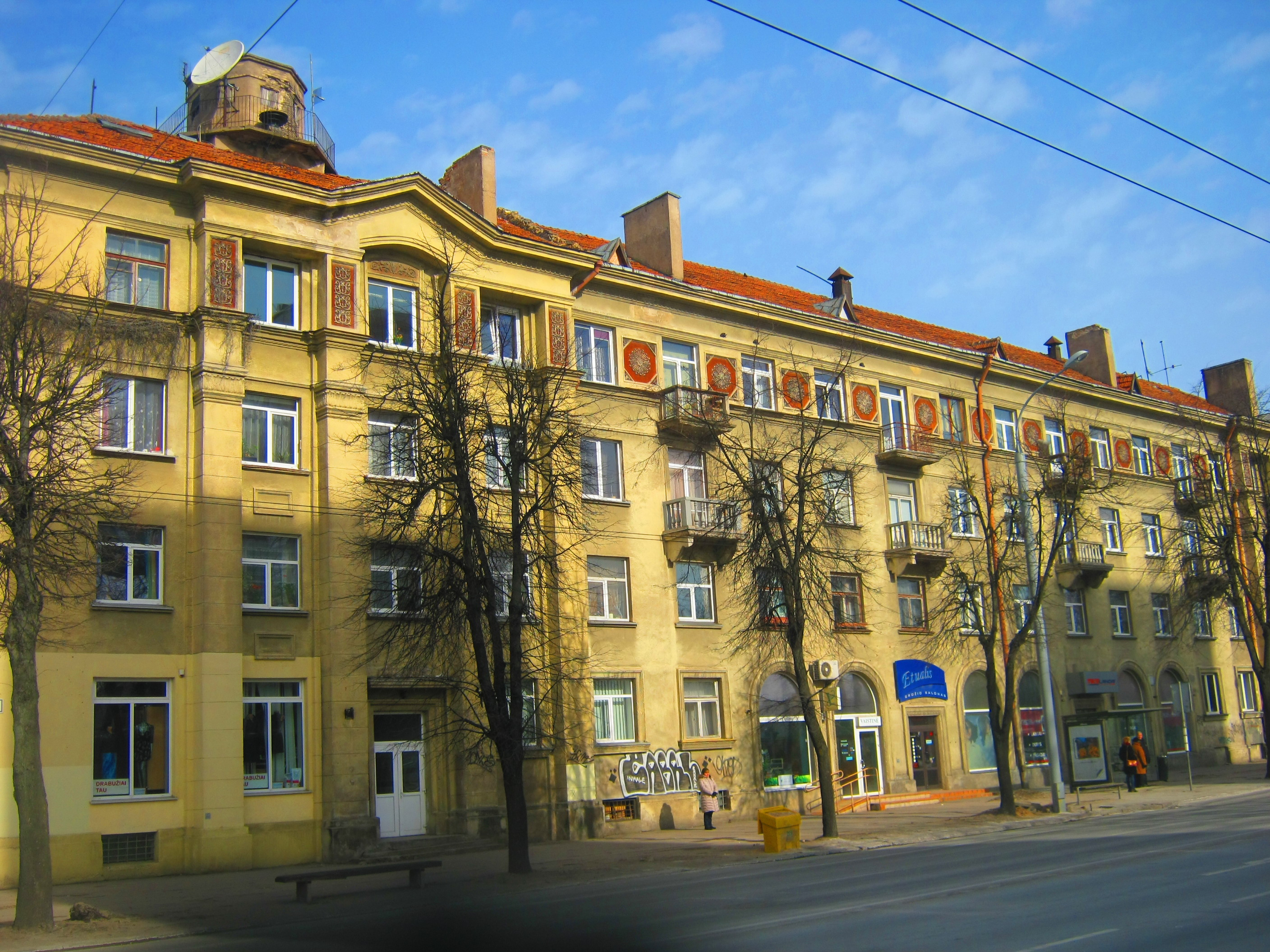
An old building in Vilkpėdė

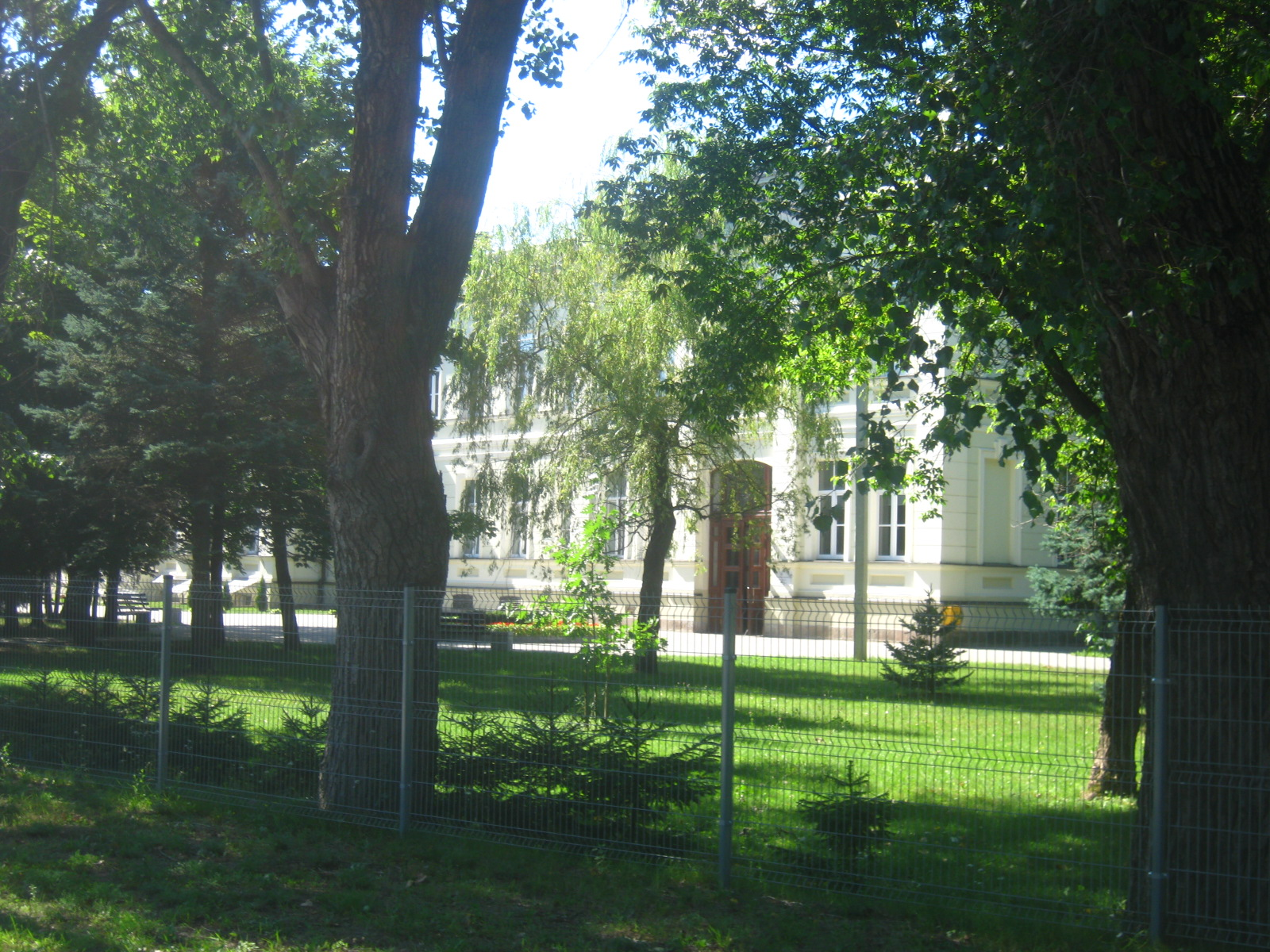
Vilkpėdė Hospital
