= Lazdynai =

- Eldership
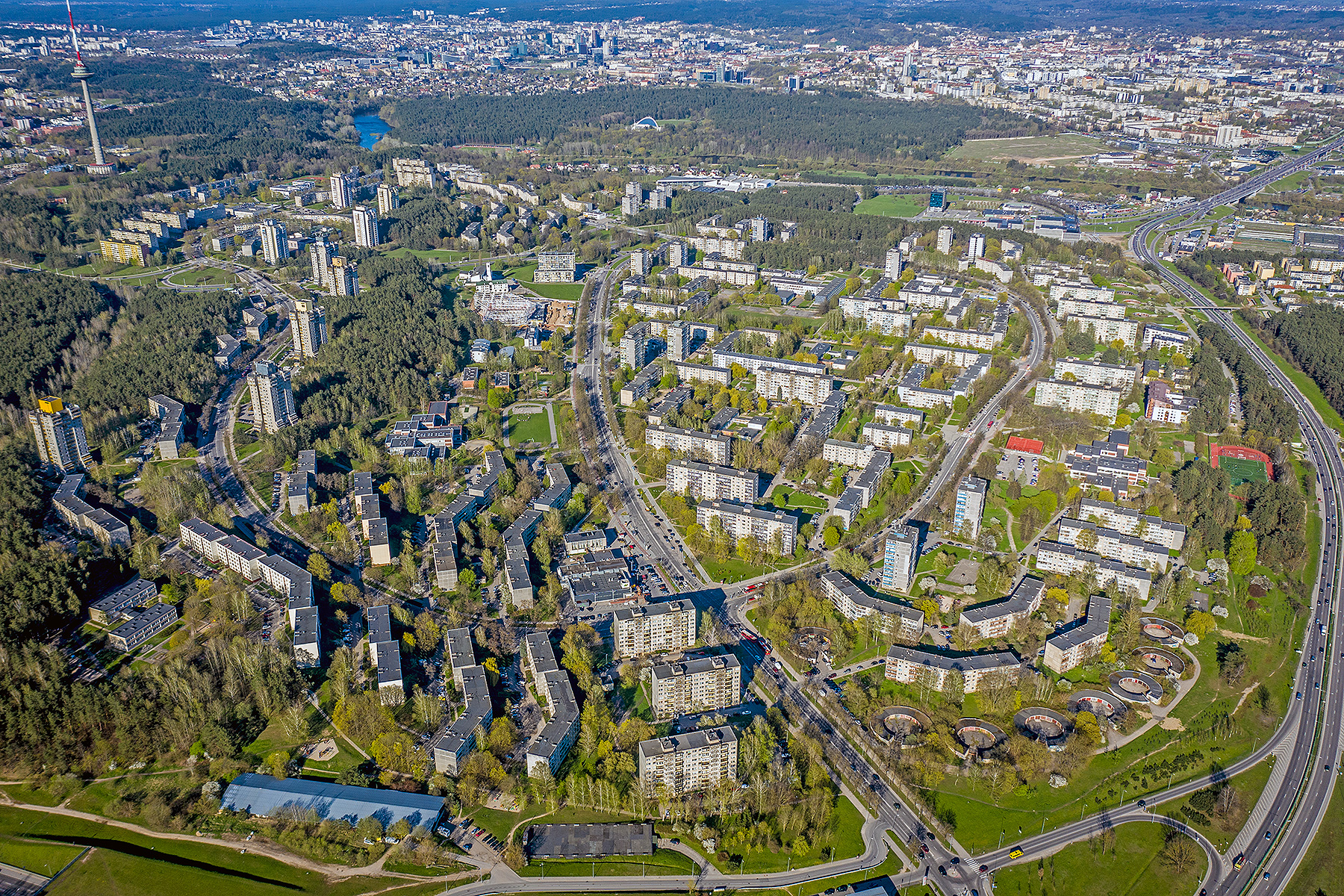
- Aerial view of Lazdynai

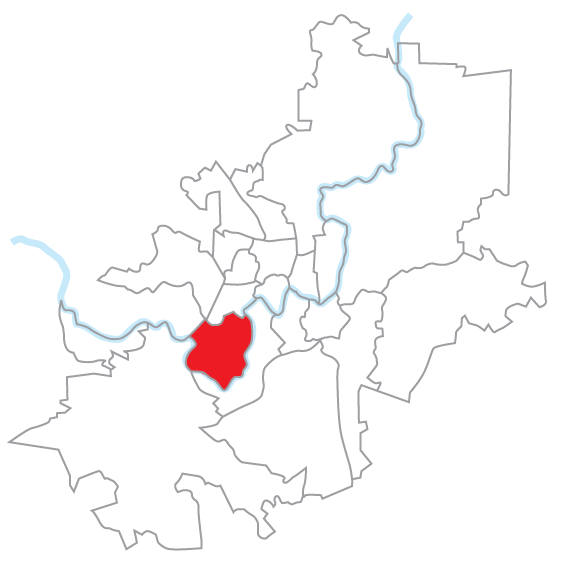

- Location of Lazdynai
- Country: Lithuania
- County: Vilnius County
- Municipality: Vilnius city municipality

Area
  - Total: 9.9 km^{2} (3.8 sq mi)

Population (2021)
  - Total: 30,945
  - Density: 3,100/km^{2} (8,100/sq mi)
- Time zone: UTC+2 (EET)
  - Summer (DST): UTC+3 (EEST)

Lazdynai (Lithuanian: Lazdynų seniūnija, Lazdynai) is an eldership of Vilnius, Lithuania, situated on the right bank of the Neris River. It covers a area of 9.9 square kilometres (3.8 sq mi) and has a population of 31,097 (according to the 2011 census). The word means "hazel bushes" in Lithuanian.

== History ==
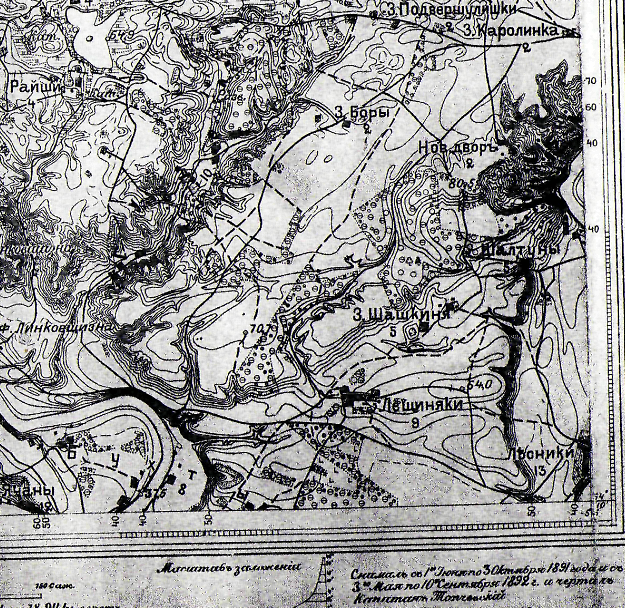
1893 map of the area from the Russian Empire

Since the 1950s, the Baltic states experienced fast population growth and faced housing shortages. When Soviet leader Nikita Khrushchev put forth his program of fast residential construction, based on prefabricated panel buildings dubbed khrushchovkas, it threatened the integrity of the well-preserved historical style of Vilnius. A group of architects struggled against the intrusion of khrushchovkas into the historical city center. Eventually they were awarded with the project to build a satellite city outside Vilnius. The chosen area was close to a Polish village of Leszczyniaki or Lazdynai in Lithuanian, situated southeast of old Vilnius. (Note: Both names, Leszczyniaki and Lazdynai apparently derive from the word for "hazelnut tree": Polish leszczyna and Lithuanian lazdynas. In Polish the term leszczyniak (singular for "leszczyniaki") also means "a person from Leszno or Leszno Voivodeship", see, e.g., the usage here).)

The architects decided to go against the Soviet architectural style and based their design on study of the architecture of Finland. Initially the authorities monitored the project with suspicion, but eventually it was accepted, and in 1974 the leading figures of the Lazdynai project (architects Vytautas Čekanauskas, Vytautas Brėdikis, Vytautas Balčiūnas, and Gediminas Valiuškis and engineers Algimantas Kleinotas and Vincentas Šileika) were awarded the Lenin Prize in architecture.

== See also ==
- Vilnius Minties Gymnasium
