= Dzieje Dobroczynności Krajowej i Zagranicznej =

Polish-language monthly published in Vilnius

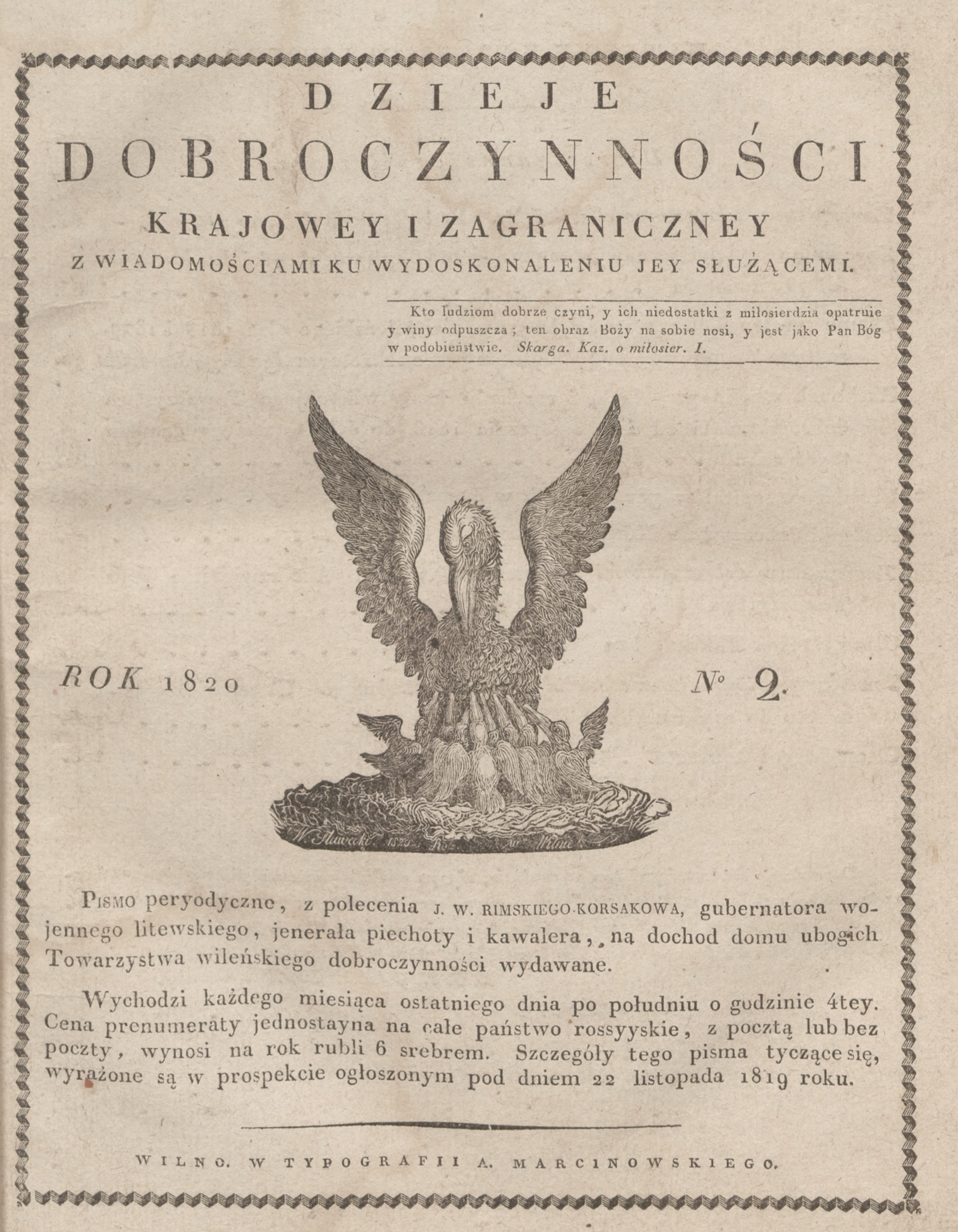
- Cover of the second issue of Dzieje Dobroczynności from 1820
- Discipline: philanthropy
- Language: Polish
- Edited by: Kazimierz Kontrym (until 1823); Michał Olszewski (from 1823)

Publication details
- History: 1820–1824
- Publisher: Antoni Marcinowski (until 1822); Józef Zawadzki (from 1822) (Russian Empire)
- Frequency: monthly

Standard abbreviations
- ISO 4: Dzieje Dobroczynności Kraj. Zagr.

Dzieje Dobroczynności Krajowej i Zagranicznej z Wiadomościami ku Wydoskonaleniu jej Służącymi was a Polish-language monthly published in Vilnius between 1820 and 1824, serving as the unofficial organ of the Vilnius Charity Society. The publication focused on philanthropy, which was a unique topic on a European scale. Its activity can be divided into two phases, separated by the turning point of 1822 and 1823. In the first phase, under the editorial leadership of Kazimierz Kontrym, the journal was primarily dedicated to secular charity, with considerable attention given to medicine and technology. In the second phase, under the editorship of Father Michał Olszewski, the journal shifted its focus toward Christian mercy, adding theological issues. The publication ceased due to financial problems.

== Establishment ==
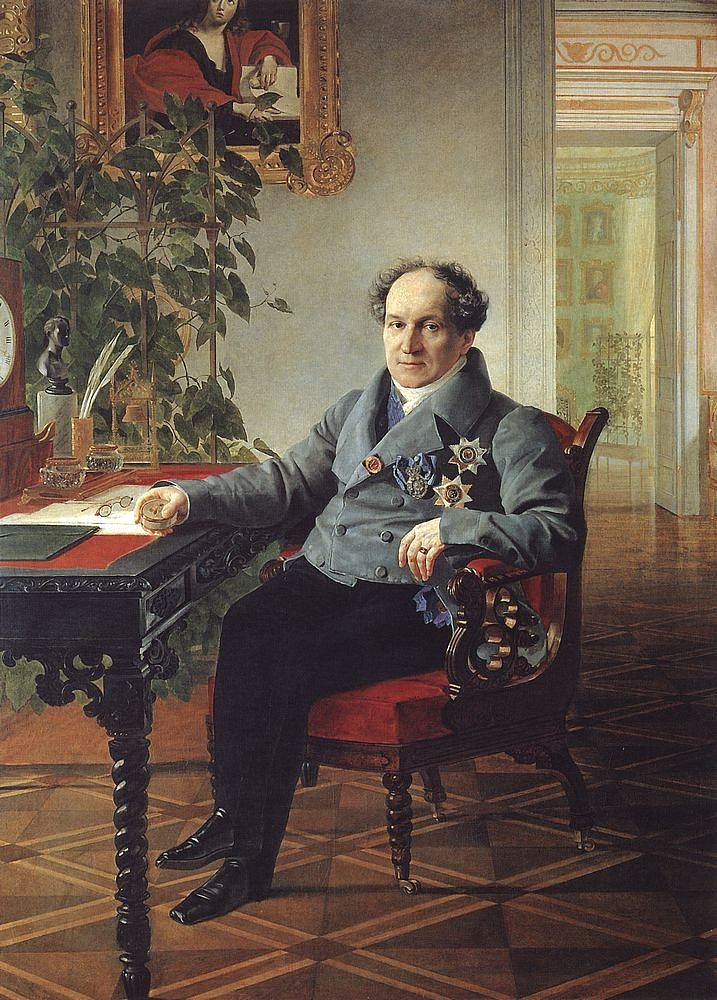
Alexander Nikolaevich Golitsyn initiated the process of establishing Dzieje Dobroczynności

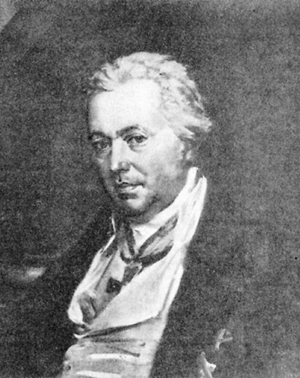
Lithuanian General-Governor Alexander Korsakov held official oversight of the journal and was also its most generous benefactor

At the beginning of the 19th century, Vilnius, with a population of over 35,000, was one of the important centers of Polish science. The activities of the Imperial University of Vilnius had a positive impact on the life of the gubernatorial city, particularly in fields such as science and journalism. Medicine and social sciences were especially developing. In 1805, the Vilnius Medical Society was established, and in 1807, the Vilnius Charity Society was founded, with the involvement of Professor Joseph Frank. This scholar, in the same year, initiated the creation of the Vaccination Institute, while his father, Professor Johann Peter Frank, also focused on social hygiene at the local university.

The rich Polish-language press of Vilnius at the turn of the second and third decades of the 19th century included titles for a wide audience: Kurier Litewski published since the beginning of the century, the literary-historical Tygodnik Wileński, the science-promoting Dziennik Wileński, and the satirical organ of the Society of Scoundrels called Wiadomości Brukowe – the latter two edited by Kazimierz Kontrym. Additionally, a number of specialized journals were published, including those related to medicine. These included Pamiętnik Magnetyczny Wileński, where Ignacy Emanuel Lachnicki published articles on animal magnetism as well as conventional medicine and hygiene, Pamiętnik Towarzystwa Lekarskiego Wileńskiego, Acta Instituti Clinici Caesareae Universitatis Vilensis, Pamiętnik Farmaceutyczny Wileński, and Dziennik Medycyny Chirurgii i Farmacji.

The idea of creating the journal came in 1819 from the Russian Minister of Education and Spiritual Affairs, Alexander Nikolaevich Golitsyn. He expected that the journal would reprint translations from Dziennik published under his initiative by the Imperial Society of Philanthropy in Saint Petersburg since 1817. This idea was supported by the Lithuanian governor-general, Alexander Korsakov. However, the Vilnius Charity Society, which was expected to publish these translations, had significant concerns, primarily financial, as the organization did not have sufficient funds. There were also fears that there would be little interest in the contents from the Russian journal among the Polish-speaking residents of the city. These assumptions were likely confirmed through a market survey – Antoni Marcinowski published subscription information for the new journal in Kurier Litewski. As a result, General Governor Korsakov proposed that instead of reprints, local content should be included in the journal. The society's approval led to the publication of a prospectus on 22 November 1819 – which has not survived to this day – for the monthly Dzieje Dobroczynności Krajowej i Zagranicznej. Korsakov's role in the creation of the journal was reflected in the inscription reprinted on the first page of the journal's issues:

A periodical, commissioned by His Excellency Korsakov, the military governor of Lithuania, a general of infantry, and a knight, issued for the benefit of the poorhouse of the Vilnius Charity Society.

Such a note, rare in journals, was likely intended to weaken the censor's zeal and to maintain the favor of the governor-general himself.

== Operations ==
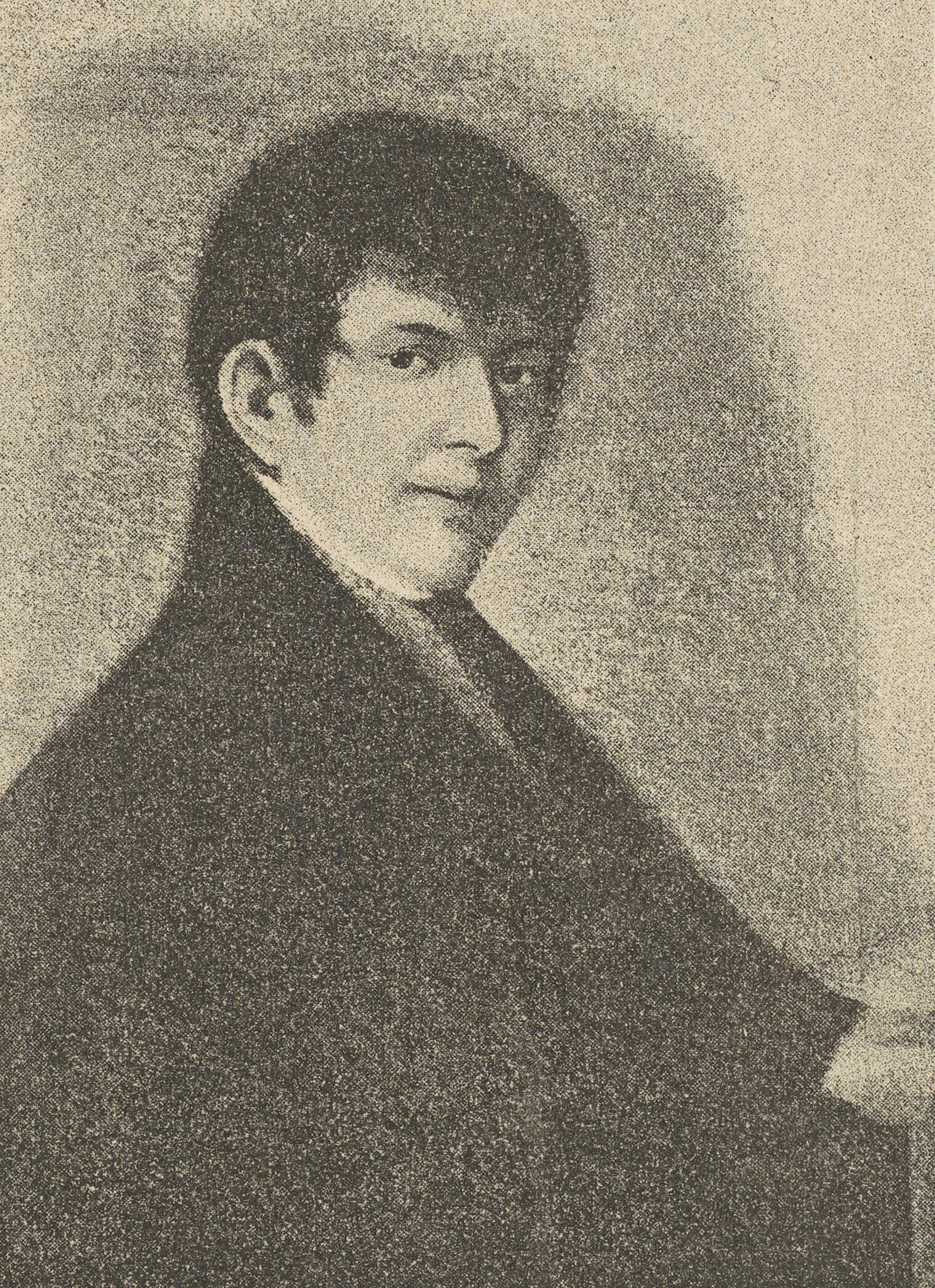
Starting in 1822, Dzieje Dobroczynności was printed by Józef Zawadzki, who was co-opted into the editorial committee that same year

The first editors of the journal were Kazimierz Kontrym, Ignacy Emanuel Lachnicki, and Antoni Marcinowski – individuals already experienced in journalism. They became part of the editorial committee, which was established by Korsakov on 9 October 1820. The committee was responsible for appointing the editor and secretary, overseeing the quality of articles, shaping the journal's profile, and managing its finances. At the head of this body, named the Scientific Committee on Matters of Charity in Vilnius, stood Actual State Councillor Andrzej Bucharski, while the role of secretary was held by university student Leon Rogalski. Both maintained their positions throughout the journal's existence. Other members included Ignacy Jundziłł, secretary of the Vilnius Charity Society, as well as figures associated with academia: Professor of Mathematical Sciences Michał Pełka-Poliński, physicist Father Eliasz Sieradzki, Professor of Pharmacy Jan Fryderyk Wolfgang, Professor of Algebra Tomasz Życki, Doctor of Medicine Father Józef Jankowski. According to the committee's original statute, its membership could be expanded to 15 members.

The changes within the committee are difficult to trace precisely, but the composition as of December 1822 has been preserved. New members included Józef Zawadzki, Wiktor Emanuel Bohatkiewicz, Prince Karol Lubecki, Doctor of Philosophy Walerian Górski, future Professor of Medicine Feliks Rymkiewicz, and Ludwik Jelski. Several clergy members also joined: Doctor of Philosophy and Theology Tadeusz Majewski, Doctor of Theology Mamert Herburt, Doctor of Theology Innocenty Kszyszkowski, and Master of Philosophy Michał Olszewski. The latter replaced Kazimierz Kontrym as editor-in-chief of the periodical.

Initially, the journal was printed by Antoni Marcinowski, but after two years, Józef Zawadzki took over.

=== Financial matters ===
The journal was intended to generate income for the Vilnius Charity Society. Each issue was priced at 50 kopecks, but it was primarily sold through subscriptions at a rate of 6 rubles for 12 issues. Starting in 1823, a subscription on higher-quality paper was also offered for 7.5 rubles. Some readers treated their subscription orders as a form of charitable contribution and paid significantly higher sums – by 1820, pledged payments were three times the nominal subscription price. However, not all of the more than 550 individuals who had pledged to subscribe ultimately followed through. The most generous subscribers included high-ranking local government officials, led by the governor.

==== Number of recorded subscribers ====
Year	1820	1821	1822	1823	1824
Number	~317	270	71	96	103

To cover expenses, additional funds were raised through donations. Besides one-time donors, there was a special group called the Benefactors of the Scientific Committee, which included figures such as Zawadzki, Ignacy Jundziłł, Andrzej Bucharski, and Joseph Frank.

The editorial board pledged to support the Charity Society with an annual contribution of 1,000 rubles, but financial difficulties prevented them from fully meeting this commitment throughout the journal's publication.

Toward the end of its run, the journal faced financial struggles, partly due to unpaid subscriptions. To address this, individual issues were made available for purchase at Józef Zawadzki printing shop.

== Structure and content ==
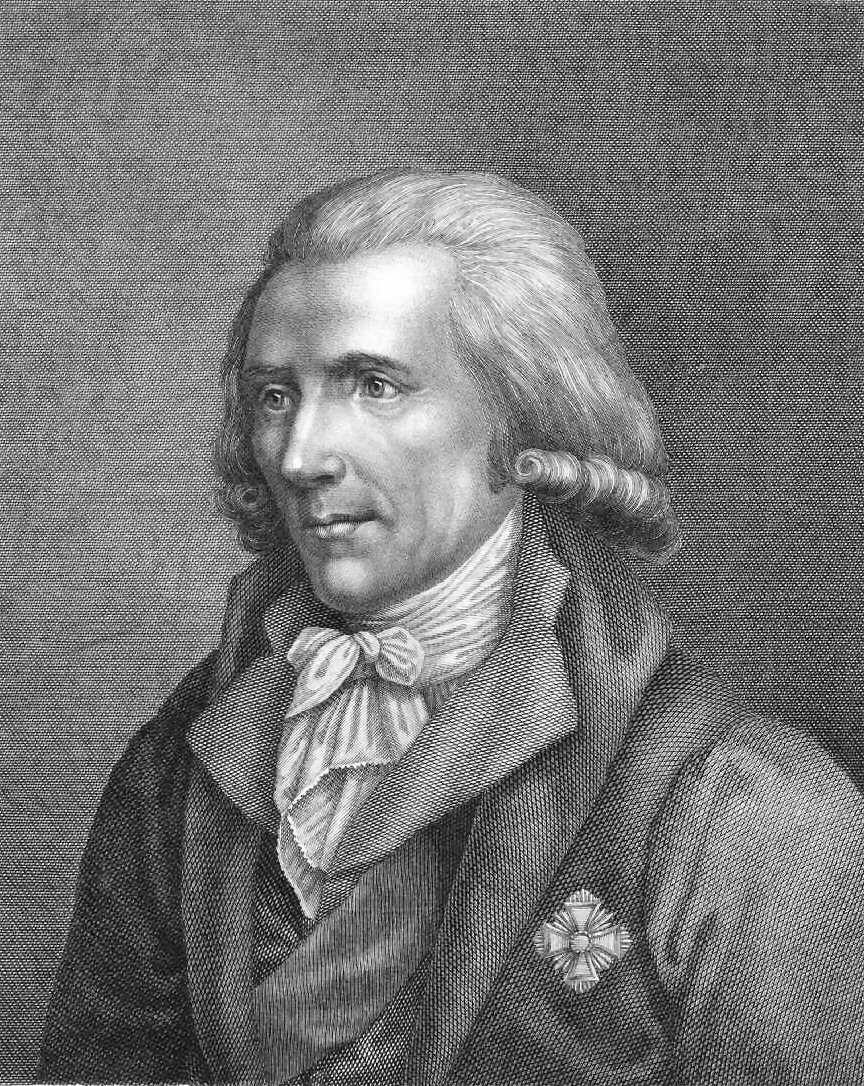
Benjamin Thompson was one of the philanthropists whose activities were frequently discussed in Dzieje Dobroczynności. The journal also published translations of excerpts from his works

A typical issue consisted of 6 to 8 sheets in A4 size, which were reduced to A5 format in 1823. The circulation was 500 copies.

The nature of the periodical was declared in the announcement from 1820, which stated that it would be dedicated to topics of social assistance. It was primarily intended to present the activities and charitable institutions operating in the western governorates of the Russian Empire, followed by those from other regions. The journal also opened its pages to theoretical articles related to poverty prevention. It was not meant to serve entertainment purposes.

The declared mission and official character of the periodical allowed its authors to occasionally smuggle in content that diverged from the official line of the Russian authorities, such as laudatory references to Polish history or discussions of social issues present in the Empire.

The journal was divided into thematic sections. The main and most extensive section, Contemporary Charity, contained information on current philanthropic initiatives, categorized by their location. It primarily published source materials, such as statutes of charitable institutions, speeches by their activists, and lists of members. This section described mainly secular charitable institutions and their activities, with a dominant focus on the Vilnius Charity Society and other social assistance efforts from the Vilnius academic district. Information was also included about initiatives from other regions of the Russian Empire, with Saint Petersburg and Moscow being the most frequently mentioned. Additionally, foreign institutions were covered, including those in Congress Poland and the Free City of Cracow. Less space was devoted to Western institutions, although articles about cities such as Poznań, Königsberg, Hamburg, Hanover, Paris, London, Florence, and Venice appeared. The journal also featured articles about distant countries like the United States and China. This section included biographies and wills of individual activists, such as the will of Franciszek Ksawery Bohusz.

Historical topics were addressed in the section Charity of Past Times. The authors were primarily interested in the lands of the Polish-Lithuanian Commonwealth. A continuous series of articles, Guide to the History of Polish and Lithuanian Charity from the Earliest Times, contained full bibliographies and information on archives. Topics included the charitable deeds of saints and legislation concerning beggars. Descriptions of former charitable institutions and biographies of past activists were standard, along with the publication of source materials.

The theoretical aspects of philanthropy were analyzed in the section The Science of Charity, and the Auxiliary Sciences, Arts, and Crafts. It featured descriptions of technical innovations improving various aspects of social assistance.

The final section, Various News, included notes on charitable collections and accompanying events such as concerts, balls, or lotteries. This section also recorded significant donations from individuals.

One aspect of social assistance was medicine. The journal reprinted an article by August Bécu, On the Excellence of Hospitals, in which the professor advocated for transitioning hospitals into medical institutions rather than mere care facilities, as they had been perceived until then. Dr. Jankowski published a treatise in Dzieje Dobroczynności on the necessity and methods of ventilation, On the Methods of Refreshing and Improving Air Harmful to Health and Making It Suitable for Breathing. The journal also printed the content of a lecture by Dr. Barankiewicz, which summarized his medical practice, On Fumigated Baths, or So-Called Fumigation Baths, Established in the House of the Charity Society. Despite the opposition of the Imperial Vilnius Medical Society, the journal published a text by Feliks Rymkiewicz on self-help: Rules of Conduct in the Absence of a Doctor for Reviving the Frozen, Suffocated, Poisoned, Drowned, Struck by Lightning, and Those Who Have Fallen or Been Hit. From 1823 onward, medical content became significantly less frequent, though articles such as Medicine for the Poor still appeared.

The journal published both original articles and reprints or translations of related publications. It reprinted content from the Polish-language Petersburg periodical Russkij Inwalid, as well as from the Journal of the Imperial Philanthropic Society. Western press sources included Bibliothèque universelle from Geneva and Annuaire de la Société Philanthropique. Additionally, the journal translated excerpts from books, such as those by Benjamin Thompson.

In 1823, the profile and structure of the journal changed under the editorship of Michał Olszewski. Medical topics gave way to theological articles, reflected in the addition of new sections that partially replaced the original ones. Contemporary Religious Charity became a separate section, focusing specifically on church institutions and clergy engaged in philanthropy. News on Religious Matters covered issues related to the church that were no longer linked to charity, such as clerical appointments, official decrees, and statistical information. The most extensive new section was Arts, Sciences, Crafts, and Trades, divided into seven subcategories, though not all appeared in every issue.

The Oratory section analyzed biblical texts and included articles by Michał Bobrowski on Bible translations, interpretative guidelines by Innocenty Seweryn Krzyszkowski, as well as various sermons and homilies. Poetry featured lyrical works, often focusing on Christian mercy. Notable contributors included Antoni Edward Odyniec, Ignacy Szydłowski, and Aleksander Chodźko. The section also featured translations of foreign poetry. History incorporated content previously found in Charity of Past Times while adding topics related to religious activities, such as monastic orders, missions, and mounts of piety. Obituaries became a separate category. Pedagogy addressed primary education, including a series of articles on the education of the deaf by Aleksandra Wolfgang. Technology was a reduced version of the former Science of Charity and Auxiliary Sciences, Arts, and Crafts. Over time, it specialized in food technology and dietetics, exemplified by the 1824 article Comparison of the Nutritional Properties of Food. Literature and Bibliography focused mainly on religious books.

The change in the journal's profile between late 1822 and early 1823 coincided with increasing censorship in Vilnius. Under the repressive policies of Nikolay Novosiltsev, historical content in the journal was particularly affected. However, the editorial board did not adopt a completely passive stance, publishing a text by Tomasz Zan, the imprisoned leader of the Filaret Association. From 1822, there was a noticeable increase in the percentage of clergymen among the journal's subscribers, suggesting that some editorial changes aimed to expand the periodical's appeal within this social group. However, this shift did not resolve Dzieje Dobroczynności's growing financial difficulties, and the journal ceased publication at the beginning of 1825.

== Significance ==
Dzieje Dobroczynności Krajowej i Zagranicznej was the first Polish-language periodical specializing in social assistance. Considered the first of its kind in Europe, the Parisian Les Annales de la Charité did not begin publication until 25 years after the Vilnius monthly (1845–1860). The journal's significance is reflected in its reach, as it found readers not only in the Russian Empire and Congress Poland but also in Austrian and Prussian territories. For historians, it serves as an excellent source for studying philanthropy, particularly in the region where it was published.

== Bibliography ==
- Piotrowska-Marchewa, M. (2004). Nędzarze i filantropi. Problem ubóstwa w polskiej opinii publicznej w latach 1815–1863 [Beggars and Philanthropists: The Problem of Poverty in Polish Public Opinion from 1815 to 1863] (in Polish). Toruń: Adam Marszałek. ISBN 83-7322-860-8.
- Urbanek, B. (1995). "Pismo społeczno-medyczne: "Dzieje Dobroczynności Krajowey i Zagraniczney…", w latach 1820–1824" [Social-Medical Journal: "Dzieje Dobroczynności Krajowey i Zagraniczney..." from 1820 to 1824]. Kwartalnik Historii Nauki I Techniki (in Polish). 2 (40). ISSN 0023-589X.
- Korybut-Marciniak, M. (2006). "Pierwsze polskie czasopismo poświęcone dobroczynności" [The First Polish Magazine Dedicated to Charity] (PDF). Biuletyn Historii Pogranicza (in Polish). 7. ISSN 1641-0033.
