= Vilnius Medical Society =

Oldest medical society in Eastern Europe

- Vilniaus medicinos draugija
- Logo, featuring goddess Isis by Jan Rustem
- Formation: 1805
- Founder: Joseph Frank (initiator)
- Founded at: Vilnius, Russian Empire
- Legal status: Active
- Purpose: Publishing and assistance in the field of medicine
- Headquarters: M. K. Čiurlionis St. 21, Vilnius
- Official language: Lithuanian
- Chairman: prof. Algirdas Utkus
- Key people: Joseph Frank, August Louis Bécu, Johannes Lobenwein, Andrzej Matuszewicz, Jędrzej Śniadecki, Gottfried Ernest Groddeck
- Affiliations: Vilnius University

The Vilnius Medical Society (Lithuanian: Vilniaus medicinos draugija) is the oldest medical society in Eastern Europe, established in 1805 on the initiative of Joseph Frank (son of Johann Peter Frank) and still continuing its activity. The same year, the society established a teaching hospital (clinic) under the Vilnius University Faculty of Medicine in Didžioji Street 1, which was the first institution of this type in Vilnius and present-day Lithuania. In a nearby building (Didžioji Street 10) the Vilnius University Therapy Clinic, Surgical Hospital, Vaccination and Maternity Institutes were established.

The society currently assists doctors to exchange scientific information, collaborates with other societies and scientists from other countries, researches the history of Lithuanian medicine, discusses current issues for doctors, organizes meetings to mark historical dates and honor the most outstanding members, publishes books and periodicals.

The history of the society, all members registrations, and their biographies were compiled to the Golden Book of the Vilnius Medical Society (decorated with the solid gold). The unique publication is now stored in the Vilnius University Library and is included in the Lithuanian National Register of UNESCO Memory of the World.

== Gallery ==
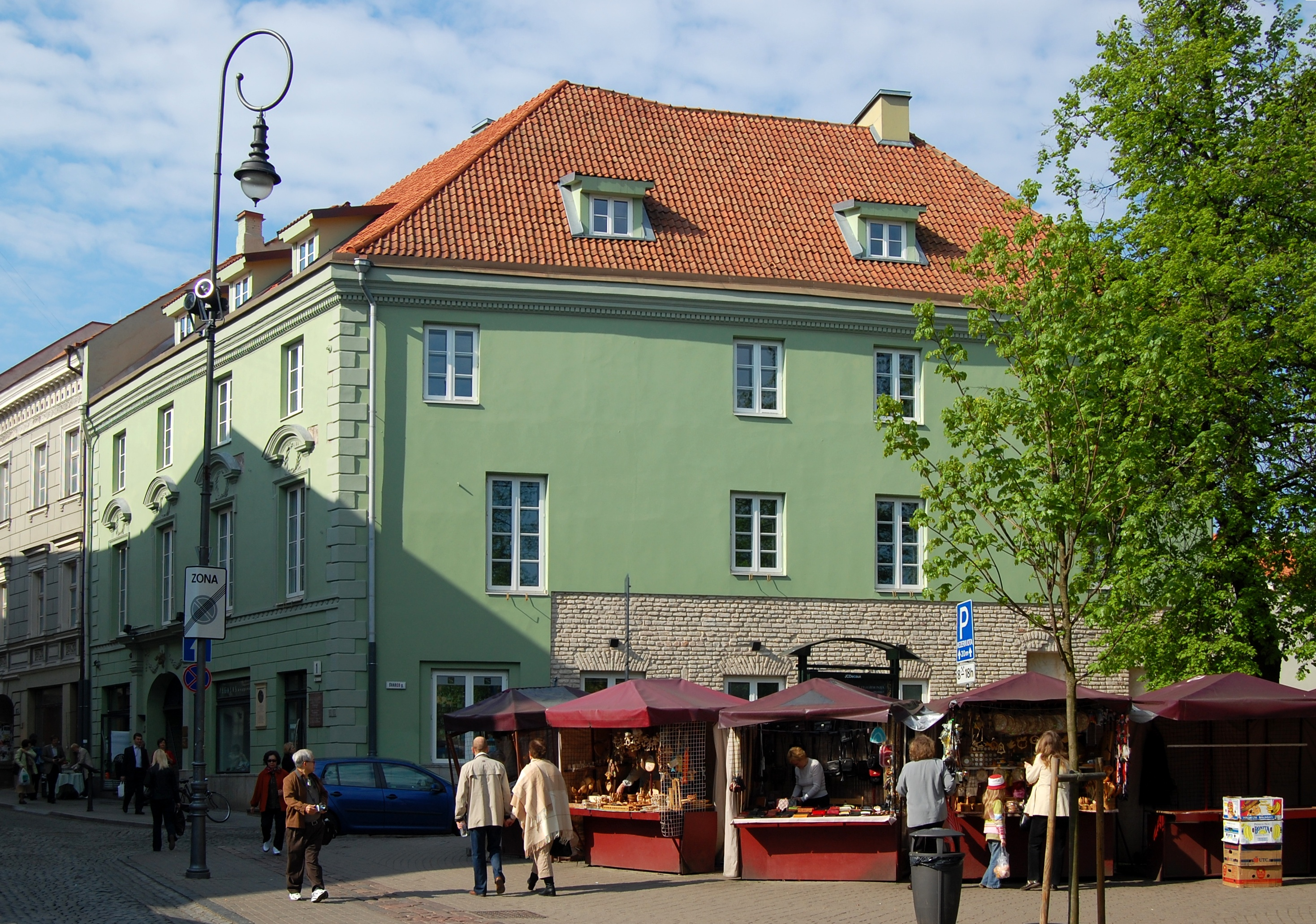
House in which the Vilnius Medical Society was established in 1805

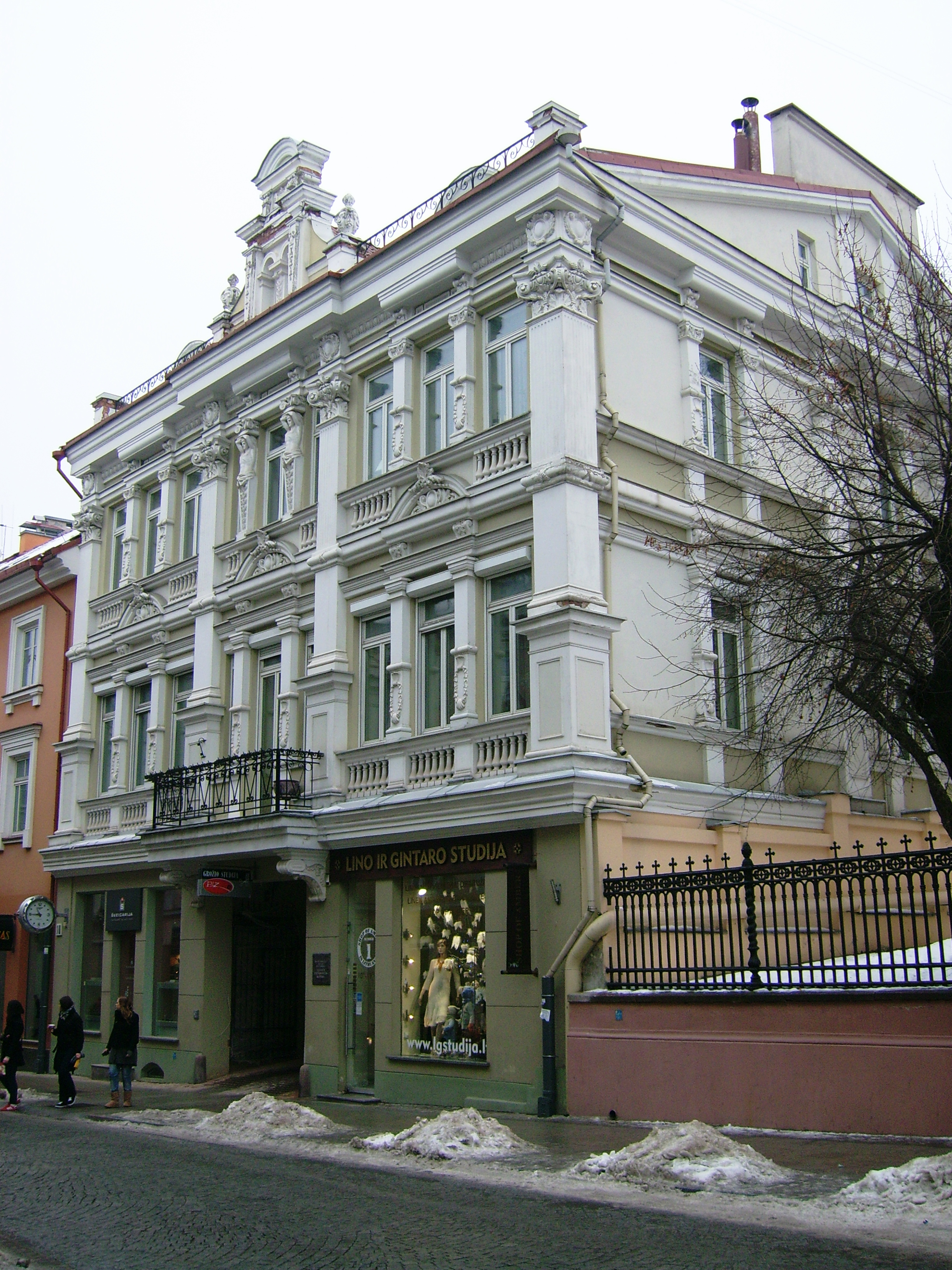
Building in which the first teaching hospital (clinic) in Vilnius was established

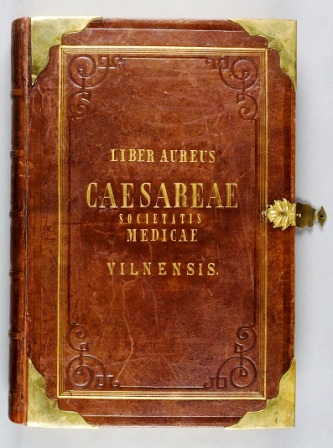
The Golden Book of the Society, launched in 1852
