= Józef Zawadzki printing shop =

Printing shop in Vilnius

Coordinates: 54°41′00″N 25°17′31″E

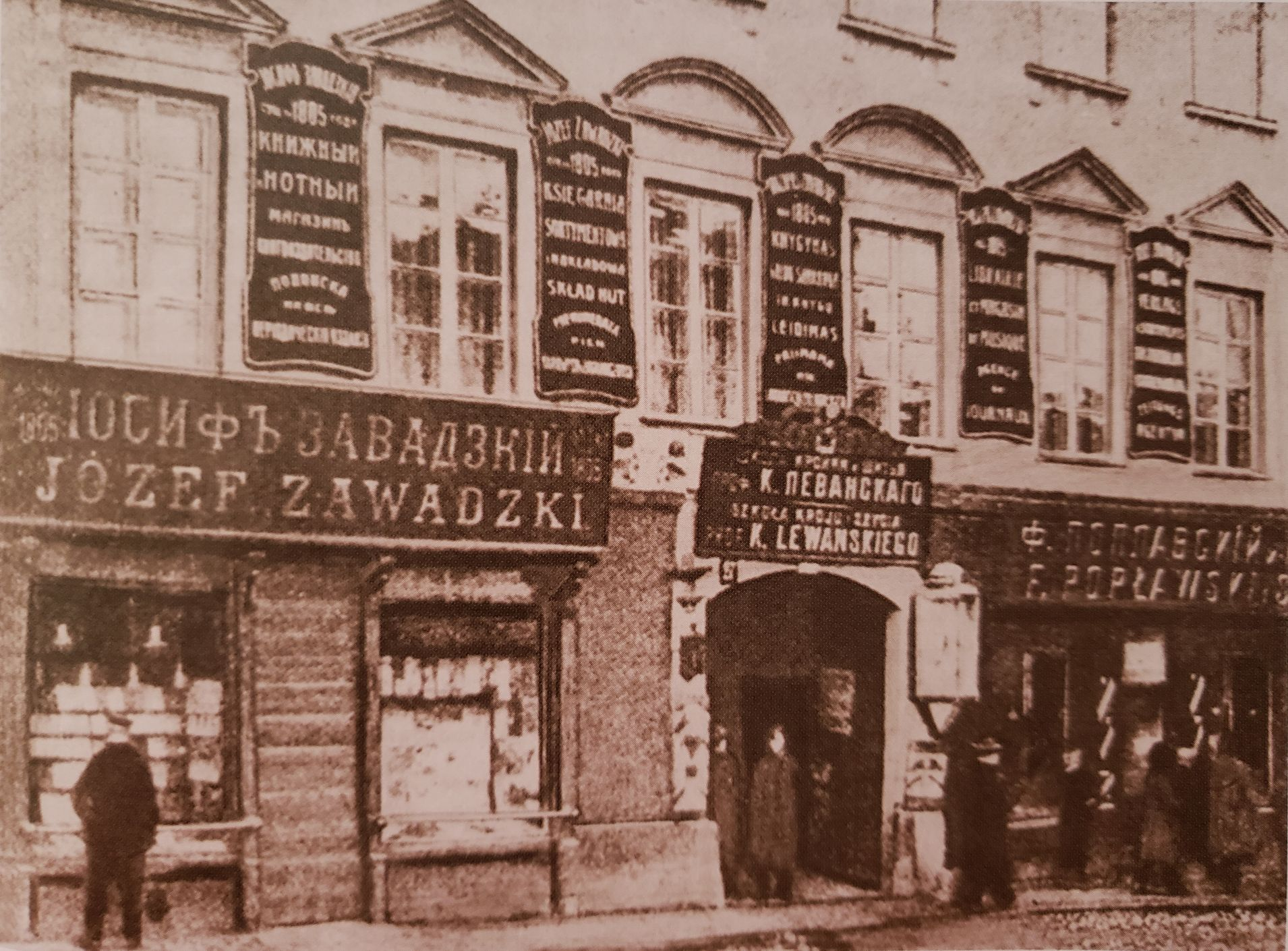
Zawadzki bookstore on the present-day Pilies Street. The store banners are printed in five languages: Russian, Polish, Lithuanian, French, and German

The Józef Zawadzki printing shop was a family-owned printing shop operating in Vilnius (Vilna, Wilno) from 1805 to 1939. It was established by Józef Zawadzki who took over the failing printing press of Vilnius University established in 1575. It was one of the largest and most prominent printing presses in Vilnius. Until 1828, it had the exclusive rights to publish university publications. It published numerous books and periodicals in Polish (e.g. the first collection of poetry by Adam Mickiewicz), Latin, Lithuanian (e.g. works by bishop Motiejus Valančius). It suffered difficulties due to Russification policies that closed Vilnius University in 1832 and banned Lithuanian press in 1864, but recovered after the restrictions were lifted due to the Russian Revolution of 1905. After World War I, it had difficulty competing with the larger printing presses in Poland. The press was sold to a Lithuanian company Spindulys in 1939 and nationalized by the Lithuanian Soviet Socialist Republic in 1940. After World War II, the press was transferred to the communist daily Tiesa.

== History ==
=== Establishment ===
Józef Zawadzki, after studies of economy and book publishing in Poznań, Wrocław (Breslau) and Leipzig, moved to Vilnius, then part of the Russian Empire, in 1803. He established a small printing press (his first work appears to be a student dissertation on galactorrhea published in June 1803). He bought inventory of the printing press of Vilnius University, which traced its roots to a press established by Mikołaj Krzysztof Radziwiłł the Orphan in 1575, on 1 November 1805 for 3,000 silver rubles payable in installments over ten years. Additionally, he rented the premises for ten years for another annual payment of 300 silver rubles. Zawadzki received financial assistance from Adam Kazimierz Czartoryski, who gifted him 1,000 ducats. The rental agreement was renewed until 1828 when Zawadzki lost the title of university printer and had to move out of the campus (at present-day Šv. Jono g. 4) to his own home (at present-day Bernardinų g. 8), where the press operated until 1940.

=== Operations ===
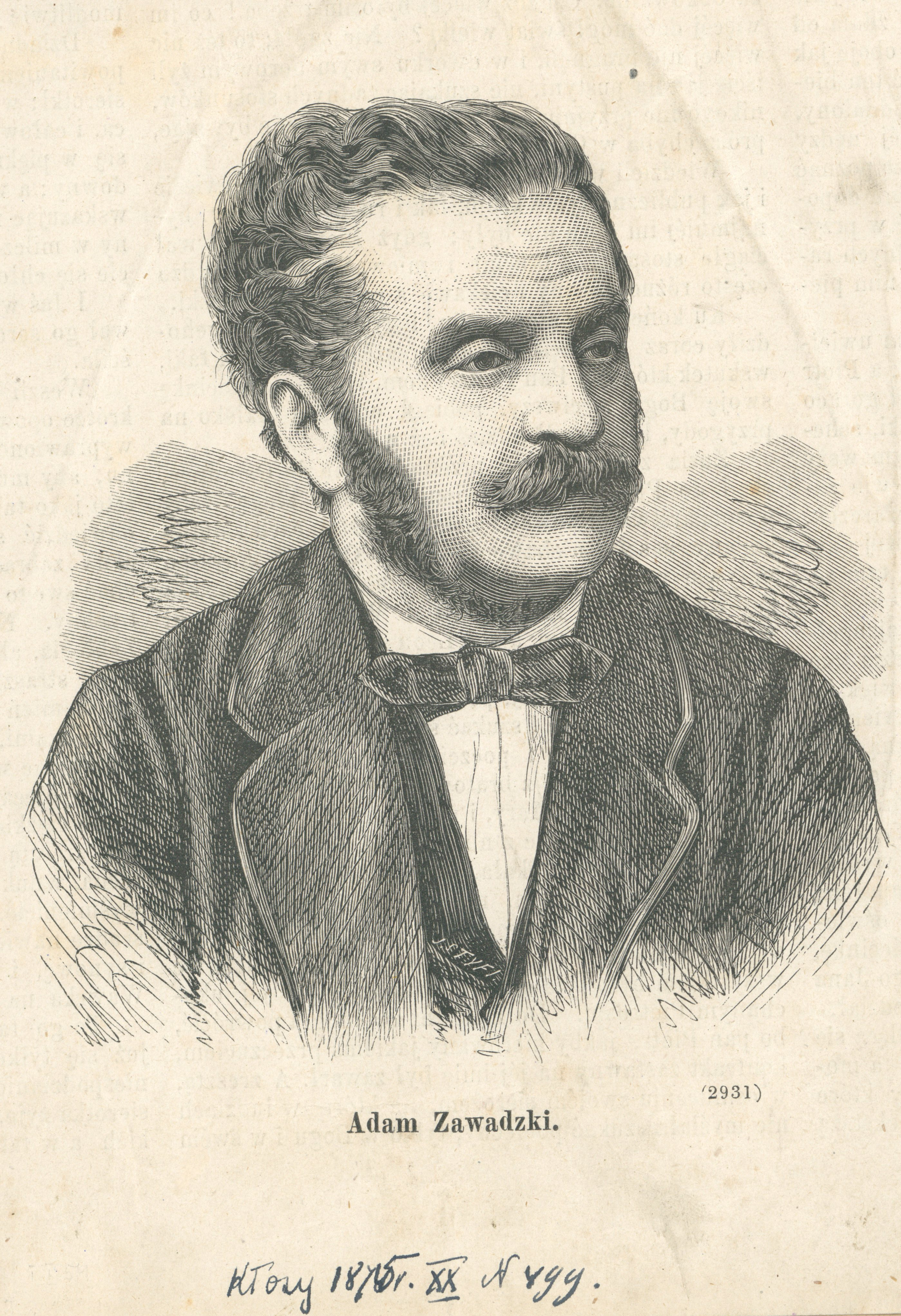
Adam Zawadzki who inherited the press from his father

When Zawadzki took over the press, he found 11 printing presses (seven of them outdated) and eight employees. He quickly purchased two new printing presses and typesets for Latin, Polish, Russian, Greek, German, Hebrew, and Arabic languages. The number of employees grew to 35 within a year. The press printed books, textbooks and academic literature for the university, periodicals, calendars, and (from 1808) sheet music. It also collaborated with the Jewish Romm publishing house. For Zawadzki, an important goal was the revival of the periodical press in Vilnius, which he achieved in 1814 with the resumption of publication of the Dziennik Wileński. In 1818, publication of the Dziennik Wileński was taken over by Antoni Marcinowski's printing house.

Zawadzki was a bibliophile and cared for the quality of the books, both in terms of accuracy of the texts (spelling, etc.) and graphic design. He hired the first full-time proofreader Jan Paweł Dworzecki-Bohdanowicz and worked with western printers to adapt new technologies. He imported high quality paper from Germany and France. To help sell the books, the press had its own bookstores in Vilnius, Warsaw, and Varniai (1853–1864). The bookstore in Vilnius was particularly large, numbering 20,000 titles in 1821. In 1853, the bookstore moved to new three-floor premises. It had sections of English, French, German, Italian, Lithuanian books and operated a library. Historian and librarian Michał Eustachy Brensztejn estimated that the bookstore in Kražiai sold about 8,000 books from late 1859 to March 1863. After the death of Józef Zawadzki, the press was inherited by his son Adam (1814–1875) but was managed by his wife until 1851.

=== Decline ===
The failed November Uprising of 1831 and January Uprising of 1863 brought a wave of repressions and restrictions on books and periodicals. The university was closed in 1832 taking away textbook and academic publishing. Particularly damaging to Zawadzki’s printing house was the ban on printing and importing Polish books into the Northwestern Krai in 1864. Restrictions on the sale of Polish books were soon introduced, and publishers were also prohibited from possessing Polish typefaces; where quotations in Polish were necessary, they had to be printed in the Russian alphabet. In 1869, publishers were once again permitted to possess Polish typefaces, although strict censorship remained in force. At the same time, the ban also affected Lithuanian publications, which could be printed only in the Russian alphabet.

When Lithuanian books were banned, the press had 5,696 copies of four primers that were confiscated and burned. It also had 62,994 copies of 36 titles of pre-1864 Lithuanian books that it managed to get a permit to sell off. Many Lithuanian publishers in East Prussia used to counterfeit publication data, indicating that a book was published by the Zawadzki Press in 1863, in order to confuse the Russian police. Although the bans on printing publications in Polish were never absolute, they led to a crisis in Polish-language publishing in Vilnius. Between 1804 and 1823, approximately 20% of all Polish books were printed in Vilnius. In 1884–1893, this share fell to just 0.44%.

=== Revival ===
The company improved its fortunes by the end of the 19th century and particularly after various restrictions were lifted due to the Russian Revolution of 1905. When the language restrictions were lifted, only three printing houses, Zawadzki’s and the two Jewish-owned presses of Blumowicz and Romm, possessed Polish typefaces. Zawadzki's was also one of the first presses to acquire Lithuanian typesets in 1904. The printing shop was now managed by Feliks Zawadzki, son of Adam. In 1909, it acquired the printing shop of Edmund Nowicki, which he had moved from Saint Petersburg in 1906. Expecting large orders from bishop Eduard von der Ropp, Nowicki employed 40–50 workers. It became a branch of the main Zawadzki Press. The effects were not long in coming. By 1910, approximately 10% of all Polish publications were printed in Vilnius. Zawadzki’s printing house played a major role in this revival, considerably expanding the scope of its activities.

=== Post-World War I ===
The company diminished during World War I and found it difficult to compete with larger printers in the Second Polish Republic. It stopped printing Lithuanian texts in 1920. In Vilnius itself, Zawadzki's printing house also began to lose its former prominence amid a surge in publishing activity, with around 30 printing houses of various sizes operating in the city. The most important of these became Ludwik Chomiński’s Polish Publishing House "Lux", renowned for its exceptionally lavish bibliophile editions. After "Lux" went bankrupt, its place was taken by Gracjan Achrem-Achremowicz’s Art Printing House "Grafika". During this period, the Zawadzki firm concentrated mainly on popular and religious publications. The company’s situation was further weakened when Feliks Zawadzki moved part of its equipment to Bydgoszcz, where in 1921 he became director of the printing works of the “Biblioteka Polska” publishing house.

The press was purchased in 1939 by Kaunas-based publishing house Spindulys. The company was nationalized in July 1940 by the newly established Lithuanian Soviet Socialist Republic. It was renamed to Švyturys (beacon) and transferred to the communist daily Tiesa in 1945. In 1989, during the rise of the independence movement, it restored its original name, Spindulys.

== Publications ==
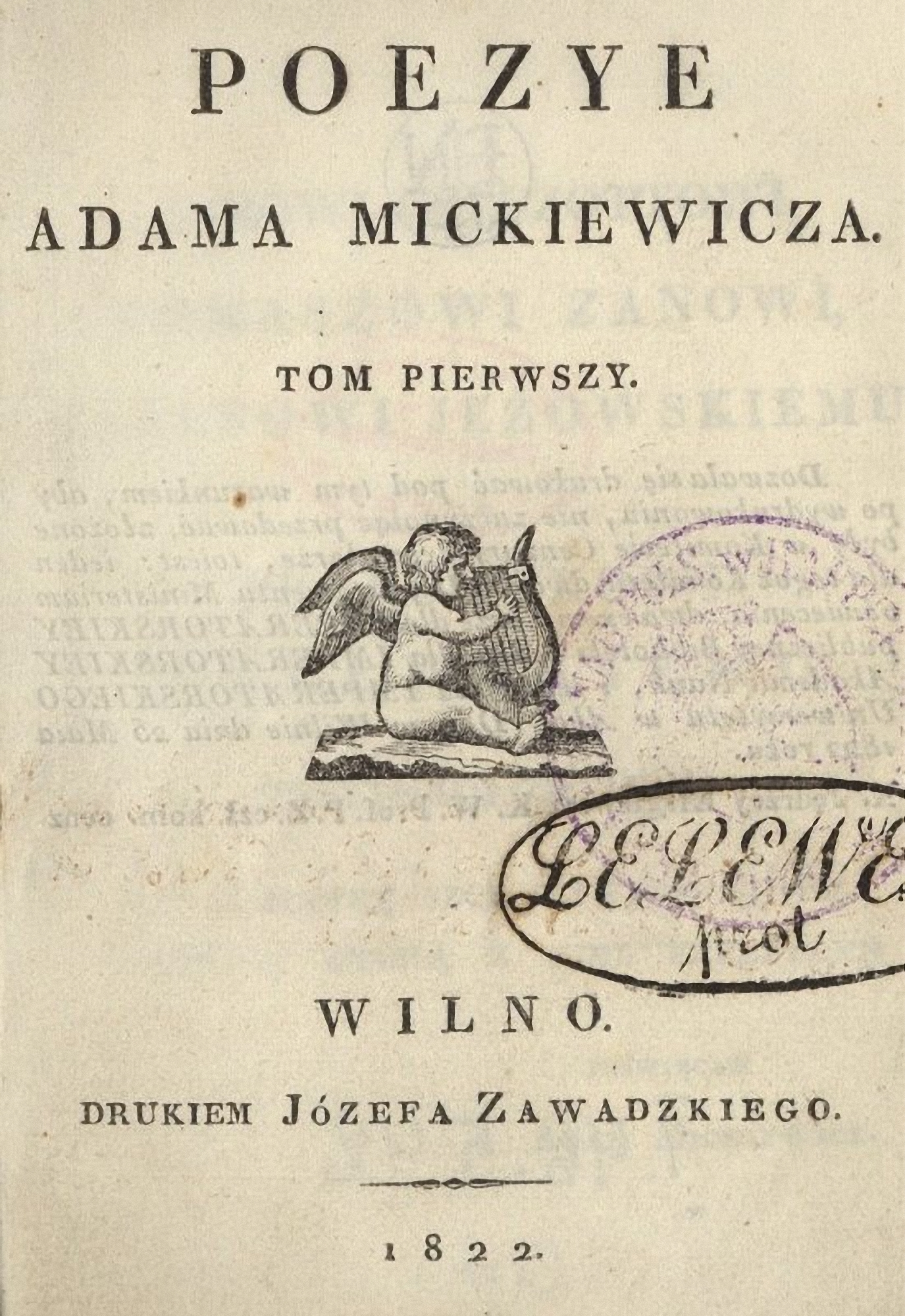
Title page of the first poetry collection by Adam Mickiewicz published in 1822

In the first three years, the press printed 27 books. In 1805–1838, under Józef Zawadzki, the press printed 851 books. Most of these books were in Latin and Polish, and only three in Lithuanian (including Lietuwiszkas ewangelias by Jonas Jaknavičius financed by bishop Juozapas Arnulfas Giedraitis). In 1854–1864, the press published 596 books – 348 works in Polish, 107 in Latin, 105 in Lithuanian, 25 in Russian, and 11 in French and German. In 1852–1862, the press published approximately 65% of all Lithuanian books published at that time.

Among the Polish works, there were works by Adam Mickiewicz (including his first poetry book in 1822), Józef Ignacy Kraszewski, Henryk Sienkiewicz, Julian Ursyn Niemcewicz, Jan Śniadecki, Joachim Lelewel. Among the Lithuanian books, there were works by bishop Motiejus Valančius, Laurynas Ivinskis, Simonas Daukantas, Konstantinas Sirvydas. During the Lithuanian press ban, the press managed to get three Lithuanian publications approved by Russian censors: 26,000 copies of two Catholic prayer books in 1879 and a petition by Donatas Malinauskas to allow Lithuanian-language services at the Church of St. Nicholas in Vilnius. In total, the press published about 700 Lithuanian books.

Periodicals printed by the Zawadski Press included:

- Gazeta Literacka Wileńska (1806)
- Dziennik Wileński (1805–1825)
- Wizerunki i Roztrząsania Naukowe (1834–1843)
- Athenaeum (1849–1851)
- Lietuvos ūkininkas, Kurier Litewski, Jutrzenka, Zorza Wileńska (1900–1910s)

== Bibliography ==
- Dunin, Janusz (1995). "Rzut oka na polską książkę w dwudziestowiecznym Wilnie" (PDF). Acta Universitatis Lodziensis. Folia Librorum (in Polish). 6: 3–17.
- Kowal, Jolanta (2016). "Rola wileńskiego typografa Józefa Zawadzkiego w rozwoju czasopiśmiennictwa polskiego na Litwie w epoce porozbiorowej". Acta Universitatis Lodziensis. Folia Litteraria Polonica (in Polish). 34 (4): 281–289. doi:10.18778/1505-9057.34.21.
- Navickienė, Aušra (2021). "Professional publishing and Lithuanian books in the first two-thirds of the 19th century in Lithuania: The case of the Zawadzki firm". Roczniki Biblioteczne. 65: 79–95. doi:10.19195/0080-3626.65.5.
- Staliūnas, Darius (2007). Making Russians: Meaning and Practice of Russification in Lithuania and Belarus after 1863. Amsterdam: Rodopi. ISBN 978-90-420-2267-6.
