= Józef Zawadzki (publisher) =

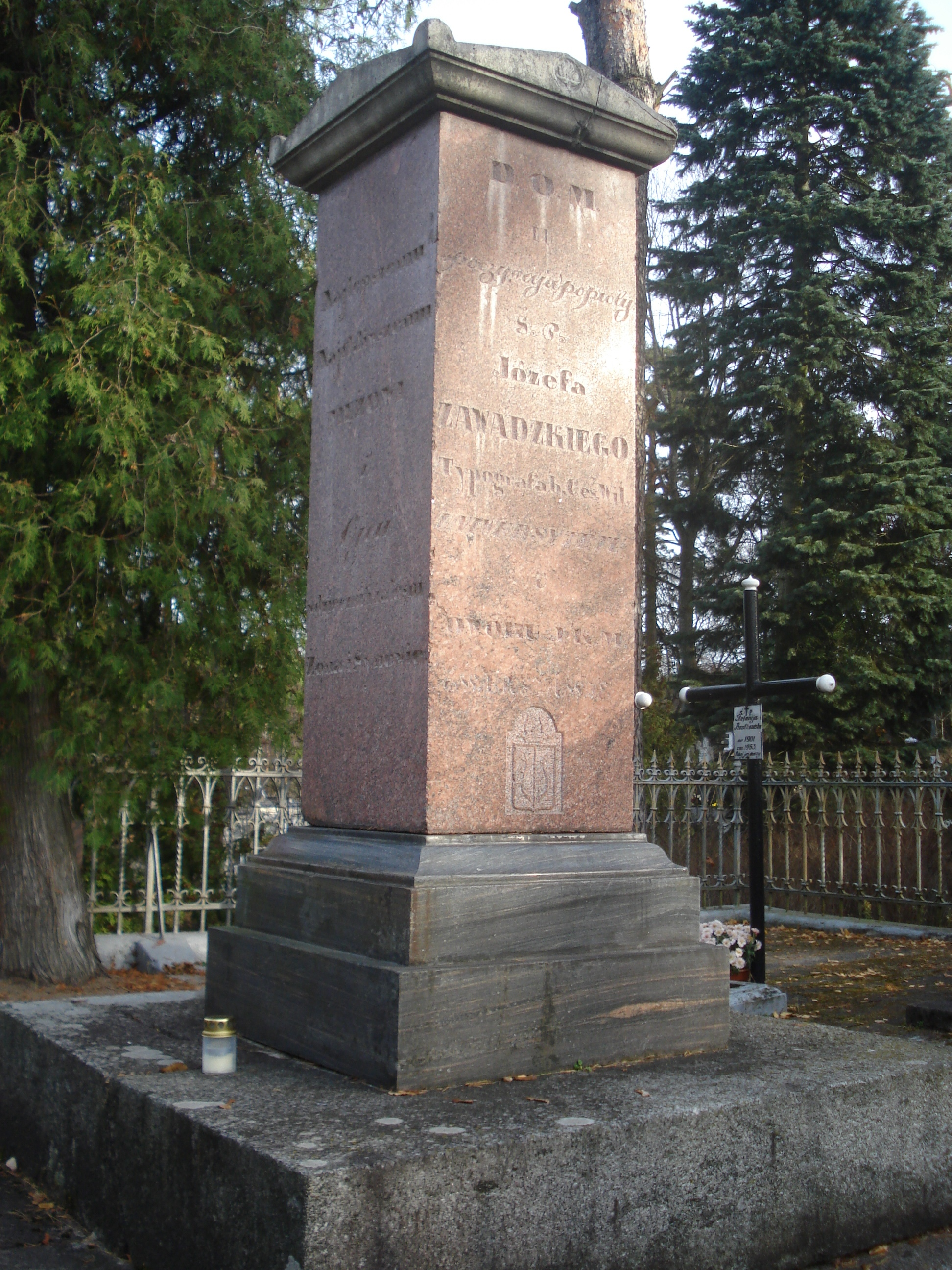
- Grave of Zawadzki
- Born: March 15 or March 7, 1781; Koźmin, Polish–Lithuanian Commonwealth
- Died: December 17, 1838; Vilna, Russian Empire
- Resting place: Saulė Cemetery
- Occupations: Pressman, publisher, typographer, bibliophile
- Known for: Founder of the Zawadzki Press
- Children: 3

Józef Zawadzki (1781–1838) was a Polish pressman, publisher, typographer and bibliophile, one of the most prominent Polish publishers in the 19th century. He was the founder of the Zawadzki Press and was the official publisher of the Imperial University of Vilnius. He published 851 books, mostly in Polish, but also in Latin, Greek, Hebrew and Lithuanian.

== Biography ==
Zawadzki was born on March 15 or March 7, 1781, in Koźmin, now Koźmin Wielkopolski, Poland. In 1805, he took over the printing press of the Imperial University of Vilnius and established his own Zawadzki Press. Until 1828, he was the official printer of the university. In 1810, Zawadzki with J. Węcki opened a branch of his printing house in Warsaw.

Zawadzki published works of fiction as well as scientific works. He published Historia literatury polskiej of Feliks Bentkowski (1814), Poezje vol. 1–2 of Adam Mickiewicz (1822–1823), works of Joachim Lelewel, Jan Śniadecki and Jędrzej Śniadecki, Słownik łacińsko-polski of Florjan Bobrowski (1822), calendars, music sheets, magazines, textbooks. He was the author of Organizacja księgarstwa polskiego (1818).

Zawadzki's bookstore served as a meeting place of writers and intelligentsia. In 1818, he was a co-founder of Towarzystwo Typograficzne in Vilnius. Starting in 1822, the journal Dzieje Dobroczynności Krajowej i Zagranicznej was printed by Józef Zawadzki, who was co-opted into the editorial committee that same year.

He died on December 17, 1838, in Vilnius and was buried at the Saulė Cemetery.
