= Dziennik Wileński =

Polish-language newspapers published in Vilnius

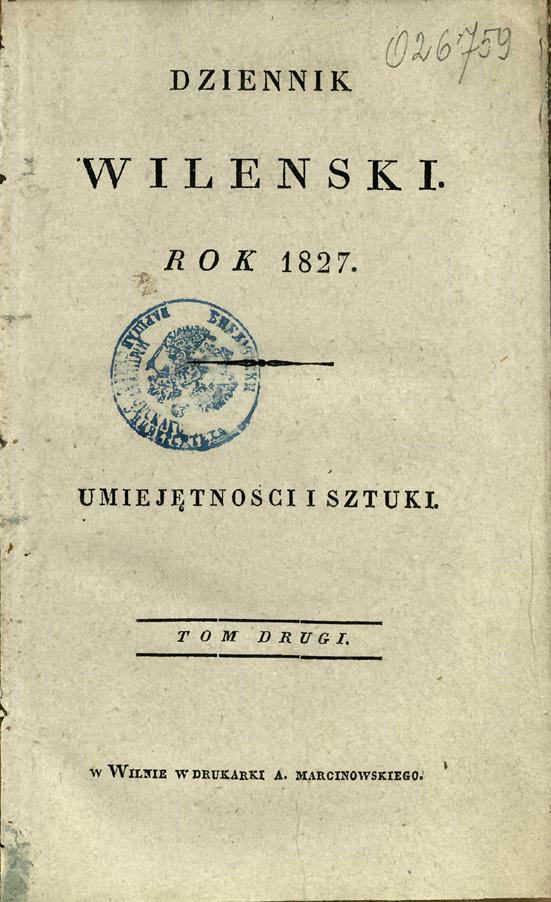
Dziennik Wileński, 1827

Dziennik Wileński (Vilnius Daily) is the name of several Polish-language newspapers published in Vilnius.

The first Dziennik Wileński was published from April 1805 to December 1806 and was associated with the Vilnius University. Some sources cite the year 1807 as the end of publication. Historians note that it "left a lasting mark on the history of Polish periodicals in Lithuania".

Another Dziennik Wileński was published from January 1815 to 1830, although some sources combine the two earlier publications, treating them as one irregularly published journal from 1805 to 1806/1807 and 1815 to 1830. Some references simply give the years 1805–1830, while others state that the publication ended in 1825.

Subsequent newspapers titled Dziennik Wileński appeared in 1906, 1907–1908, and 1916–1938 (also under the name Głos Wileński). From 1928 to 1938, the Wileński Dziennik Wojewódzki was also published. The Dziennik from 1916 to 1938 was described as one of "the most important daily publications during the interwar period in northeastern Poland".

Notable individuals associated with Dziennik Wileński include:

- Stanisław Bonifacy Jundziłł (co-founder in 1805)
- Józef Ignacy Kossakowski (co-founder in 1805)
- Józef Zawadzki (printer for the 1805–1806 edition)
- Gotfryd Ernest Groddeck (editor circa 1805–1806)
- Józef Mostowski (editor circa 1805–1806)
- Jędrzej Śniadecki (for the years circa 1805–1830, co-founder)
- Kazimierz Kontrym (editor, co-founder in 1815)
- Antoni Marcinowski (co-founder in 1815)
