= Johann Peter Frank =

German physician (1745–1821)

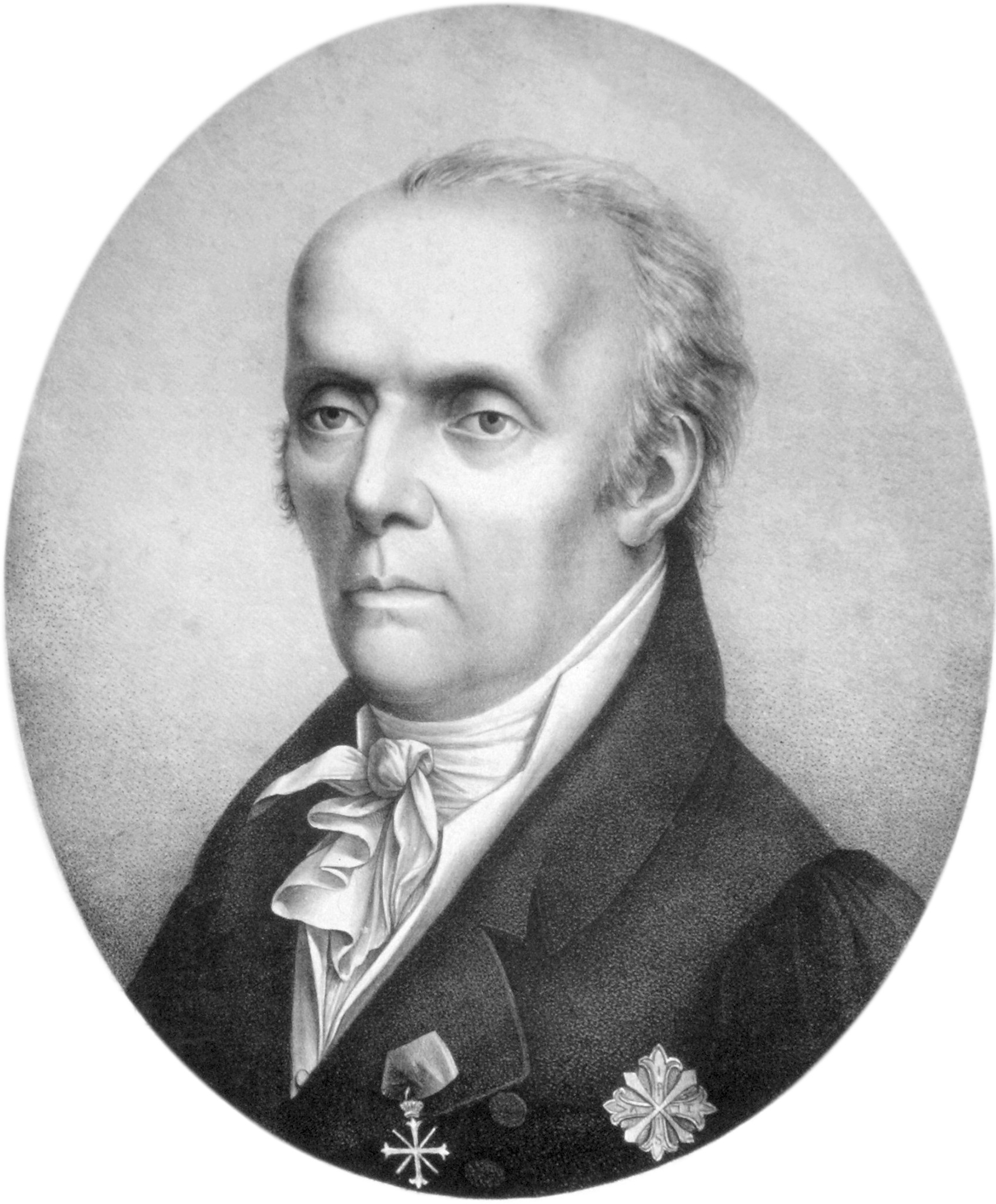
Johann Peter Frank, 1819.

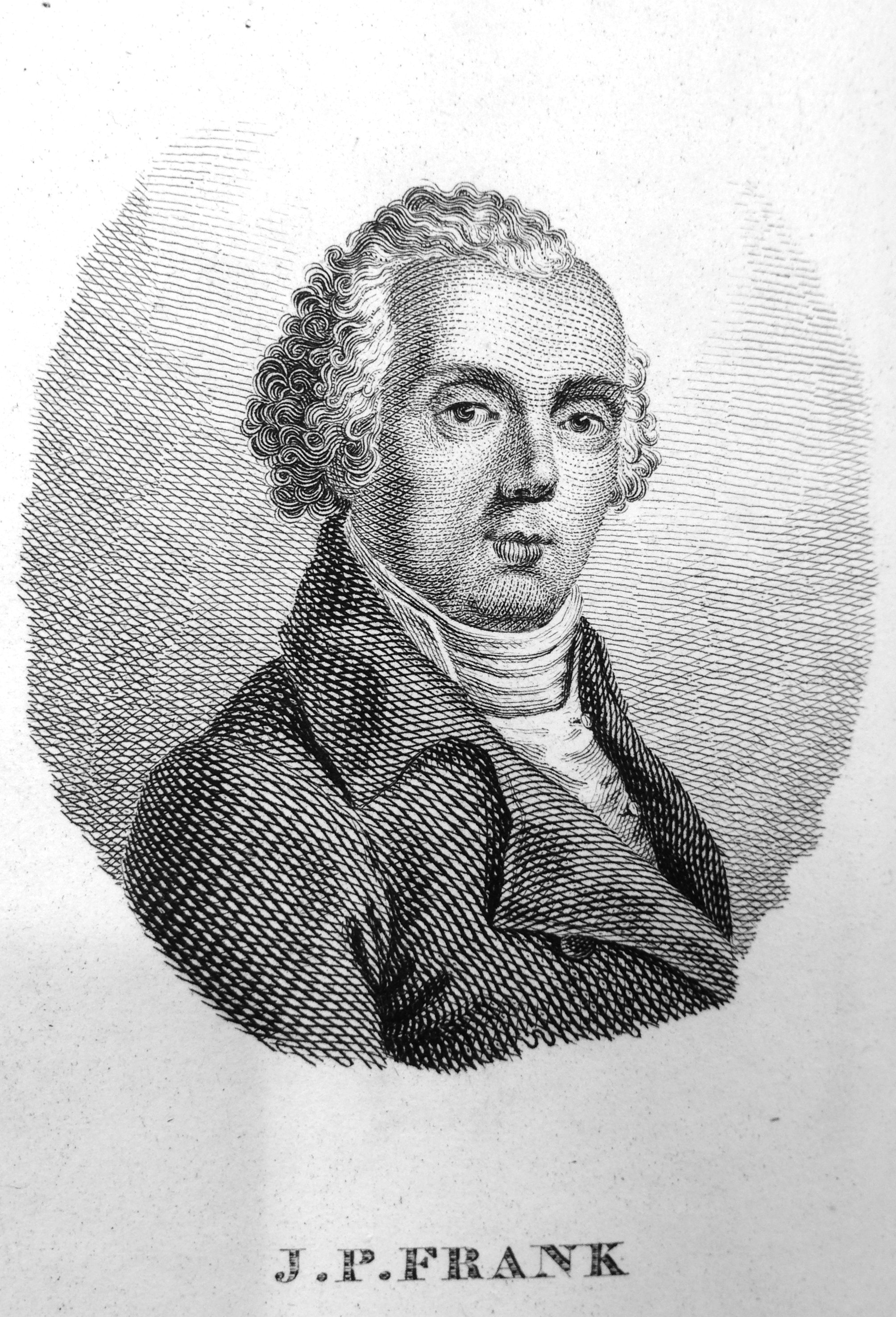
Engraving from his book De curandis hominum morbis (1832).

Johann Peter Frank (19 March 1745 – 24 April 1821) was a German medical doctor and hygienist.

== Biography ==
He was born in Rodalben. His first studies were in theology. He then studied medicine at the Universities of Strasbourg and Heidelberg, and earned his medical doctorate in 1766. He practiced medicine in Bruchsal and elsewhere for a time, and then became physician to the prince-bishop of Speyer. He was appointed professor of physiology and medical policy at the University of Göttingen in 1784, but the next year he went to Italy for his health and joined the faculty of the University of Pavia, where he succeeded Samuel-Auguste Tissot teaching clinical medicine (1785-1795).

He was appointed sanitary inspector general of Lombardy, and introduced reforms in medical instruction and practice. The rank of councillor was conferred on him by the king of England, and later by the emperor of Austria, who employed him in 1795 for the regulation of the sanitary service of the army and as director general of the principal hospital of Vienna.

In 1804, he went to Vilnius University as professor of clinical medicine, and then for a period of time (1805–1808), he was personal physician to Czar Alexander I, and also professor at the medical and surgical academy of St. Petersburg. In 1808, he returned to Vienna, where he was professor of medicine at the University of Vienna, as well as director of the Allegemeines Krankenhaus.

He died in Vienna.

== Work ==
Johann Frank was an important figure in the early history of social medicine and public health. For much of his career he worked on the System einer vollständigen medicinischen Polizey (A Complete System of Medical Policy), which was a comprehensive 9-volume treatise on all aspects of hygiene and public health. This work was first published in 1779, and was continued until 1827, six years after Frank's death. His methodology for public health dealt with subjects such as public sanitation, water supply issues, sexual hygiene, maternal and child welfare, food safety, and prostitution, to name a few.

He stressed the importance of keeping accurate statistical records for hospitals. Reportedly, Frank's system of record compilation was used by obstetrician Ignaz Semmelweiss (1818–1865) to demonstrate the correlation between puerperal sepsis and unsanitary obstetrical practices. As a director of the Narrenturm, he was also responsible for allowing Franz Joseph Gall access to psychiatric patients in the mid-1780s—a major formative experience for Gall.

Frank is credited with being the first physician to describe clinical differences between diabetes mellitus and diabetes insipidus.

== Family ==
His son, Joseph Frank, was a noted physician.

== Recognition ==
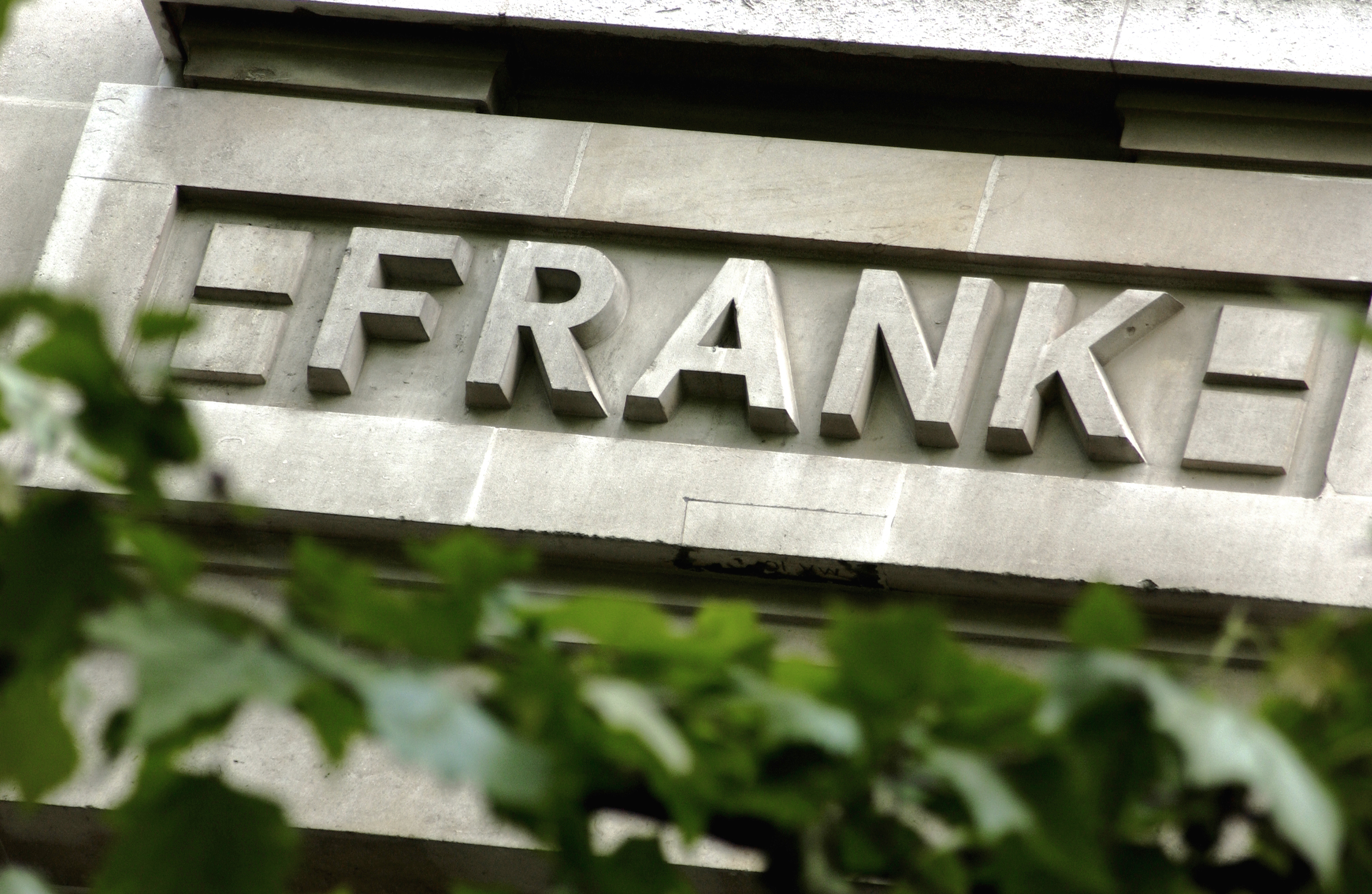
Johann Frank's name as it appears on the LSHTM Frieze.

Frank's name features on the Frieze of the London School of Hygiene & Tropical Medicine. Twenty-three names of public health and tropical medicine pioneers were chosen to feature on the School building in Keppel Street when it was constructed in 1926.

The Frank – van Swieten Lectures, an international course about strategic information management in hospitals, that is organised by TU Braunschweig, University of Amsterdam, University of Heidelberg, UMIT at Hall near Innsbruck, Fachhochschule Heilbronn and Leipzig University, is named after him.
