= Joseph Frank (physician) =

German physician

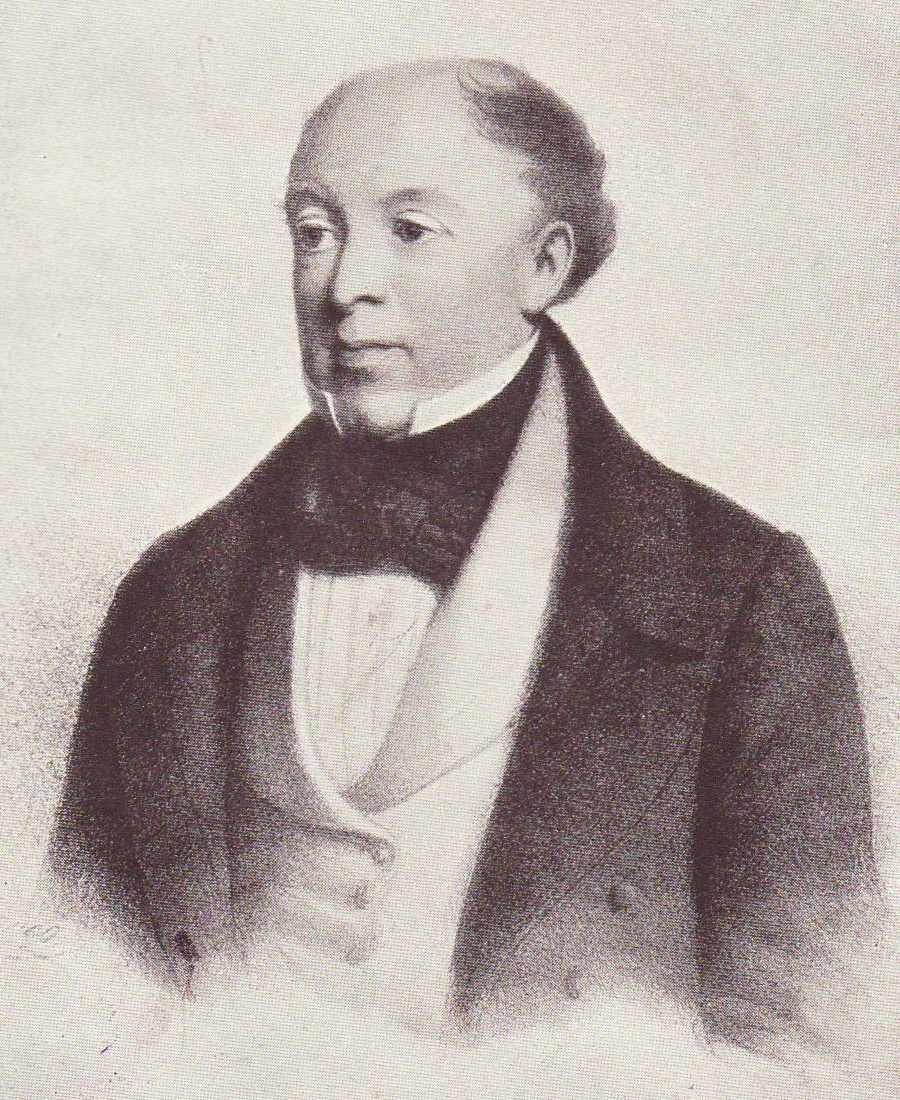
Joseph Frank (1771–1842)

Joseph Frank (23 December 1771, in Rastadt – 18 December 1842, in Como) was a German physician.

== Biography ==
He was the son of physician Johann Peter Frank. He assisted his father in Pavia and Vienna, and became in 1804 a professor of pathology at Vilnius University. At Vilnius he founded a vaccination institute (1808), a maternity institute (1809) and an out-patients' clinic (1807). The Vilnius Medical Society was founded on his initiative. He retired in 1824 on account of a disease of the eyes, now thought to be pink eye.

== Work ==
He was one of the more influential advocates of the Brunonian system of physic, and published "Grundriss der Pathologie nach den Gesetzen der Erregungstheorie" (Vienna, 1803). As his career progressed, however, he became highly critical of Brunonianism. His "Praxeos Medicæ Universæ Præcepta" (Leipzig, second edition, 1826–43) has been translated into German (9 volumes, 1828–43) and French.
