= Meanings of minor-planet names: 68001–69000 =

As minor planet discoveries are confirmed, they are given a permanent number by the IAU's Minor Planet Center (MPC), and the discoverers can then submit names for them, following the IAU's naming conventions. The list below concerns those minor planets in the specified number-range that have received names, and explains the meanings of those names.

Official naming citations of newly named small Solar System bodies are approved and published in a bulletin by IAU's Working Group for Small Bodies Nomenclature (WGSBN). Before May 2021, citations were published in MPC's Minor Planet Circulars for many decades. Recent citations can also be found on the JPL Small-Body Database (SBDB). Until his death in 2016, German astronomer Lutz D. Schmadel compiled these citations into the Dictionary of Minor Planet Names (DMP) and regularly updated the collection.

Based on Paul Herget's The Names of the Minor Planets, Schmadel also researched the unclear origin of numerous asteroids, most of which had been named prior to World War II. This article incorporates text from this source, which is in the public domain: SBDB New namings may only be added to this list below after official publication as the preannouncement of names is condemned. The WGSBN publishes a comprehensive guideline for the naming rules of non-cometary small Solar System bodies.

== 68001–68100 ==
Named minor planet	Provisional	This minor planet was named for...	Ref · Catalog
68021 Taiki	2000 YU_{17}	The Japanese Taiki Town, located in the eastern part of Hokkaido, is a beautiful town blessed with clear streams and a large park filled with wild flowers on its shore. The town's Multipurpose Aerospace Park has a 1000-m airstrip where many experiments related to aerospace and large scientific balloons are undertaken.	JPL · 68021

== 68101–68200 ==
back to top

Named minor planet	Provisional	This minor planet was named for...	Ref · Catalog
68109 Naomipasachoff	2000 YH_{135}	Naomi Pasachoff (born 1947), American scientific biographer and amateur astronomer who has written scientific biographies of Marie Curie, Alexander Graham Bell, Bohr, Newton, Einstein, Pauling and others. She has viewed more than 20 solar eclipses and continues to work on bringing science to the public.	JPL · 68109
68114 Deákferenc	2001 AC	Ferenc Deák (1803–1876), a Hungarian statesman, Minister of Justice and honorary member of the Hungarian Academy of Sciences, whose negotiations led to the establishment of the dual monarchy of Austria-Hungary in 1867. He was known as "The Sage Of The Country".	JPL · 68114
68144 Mizser	2001 AW_{38}	Attila Mizsér (born 1958) has been one of the leaders of Hungarian amateur astronomy for more than two decades. Long-time leader of the Variable Star Section of the Hungarian Astronomical Association, he has made over 52,000 visual brightness estimates of variable stars. He is also editor-in-chief of Meteor.	JPL · 68144

== 68201–68300 ==
back to top

Named minor planet	Provisional	This minor planet was named for...	Ref · Catalog
68218 Nealgalt	2001 CO_{31}	Neal Galt, American amateur astronomer and newspaper columnist who has helped popularize astronomy in southeastern Arizona with his Backyard Astronomer column in the local media.	JPL · 68218

== 68301–68400 ==
back to top

Named minor planet	Provisional	This minor planet was named for...	Ref · Catalog
68325 Begues	2001 HO_{16}	The Begues Observatory (170), in Catalan: Observatori Astronòmic de Begues, is an amateur observatory operated by Pepe Manteca, where this asteroid was discovered. From its altitude of 500 meters, the observatory offers a panoramic view of Barcelona and its suburbs some 25 kilometers away. Begues appears for the first time in history books as the place where Wifredo el Velloso defeated the Lord of Lérida, Llop Ibu Muhammed el Kari, on 11 August 897 (Src).	JPL · 68325

== 68401–68500 ==
back to top

Named minor planet	Provisional	This minor planet was named for...	Ref · Catalog
68410 Nichols	2001 QB_{154}	Nichelle Nichols (1932–2022), an American author and actress, was best known for her role as Lt. Nyota Uhura in the Star Trek series. She has also been a global ambassador for NASA, a recruiter of astronauts and an inspirer of millions as an author of science fiction. She stood undaunted in her belief that humankind must seek new knowledge (Src).	JPL · 68410
68448 Sidneywolff	2001 SW_{4}	Sidney C. Wolff (born 1941), American director of Kitt Peak National Observatory during 1984–1987 and the National Optical Astronomy Observatory during 1987–2001, president of the American Astronomical Society (1992–1994) and the Astronomical Society of the Pacific (1985–1986), and a founding editor of the Astronomy Education Review.	JPL · 68448

== 68501–68600 ==
back to top

Named minor planet	Provisional	This minor planet was named for...	Ref · Catalog
68585 Skorov	2002 AY_{6}	Yuri Skorov, Russian planetary scientist based in Germany.	IAU · 68585

== 68601–68700 ==
back to top

Named minor planet	Provisional	This minor planet was named for...	Ref · Catalog
There are no named minor planets in this number range

== 68701–68800 ==
back to top

Named minor planet	Provisional	This minor planet was named for...	Ref · Catalog
68718 Safi	2002 DQ	Safi, an old Moroccan city located on the Atlantic coast. This port is well known for its sardine fisheries, phosphate industry and handmade pottery. The city is also the birthplace of Salwa Ory, wife of Swiss astronomer Michel Ory, who discovered this minor planet.	JPL · 68718
68719 Jangyeongsil	2002 DW	Jang Yeongsil (1390–1450), a medieval Korean scientist. He is known for the invention of the water clock, Jagyeokru and Okru, the advancement of bronze-type printing technology and the development of astronomical instruments. The JangYeongSil Award, an annual Korean new technology product award, is also named after him.	JPL · 68719
68730 Straizys	2002 EA_{13}	Vytautas Straižys (born 1936) a Lithuanian astronomer who was head of the Moletai Observatory and other astronomical institutions in Lithuania. A specialist in stellar photometry and classification, he authored the Vilnius photometric system. He founded the international journal Open Astronomy and served as president of IAU Commission 45.	JPL · 68730
68779 Schöninger	2002 FA_{3}	"Schöninger", was German name used for Mount Kleť during the 17th–19th century where the discovering Kleť Observatory is located. The name means "a place with a beautiful view" in German and appears on many historical maps. In the popularized form Šenýgl, the name is still used locally.	JPL · 68779

== 68801–68900 ==
back to top

Named minor planet	Provisional	This minor planet was named for...	Ref · Catalog
68853 Vaimaca	2002 HA_{9}	Vaimaca was one of the four "last charrás", native Uruguayan Indians sold by the state to a French manager to be exhibited in France in 1833. He had been an Indian chief who served as a soldier in the army of the Uruguayan national hero José Artigas. Vaimaca's mortal remains were repatriated from France to Uruguay in 2002.	JPL · 68853

== 68901–69000 ==
back to top

Named minor planet	Provisional	This minor planet was named for...	Ref · Catalog
68947 Brunofunk	2002 PW_{156}	Bruno Funk (born 1930) a German amateur astronomer who founded the Messelberg Observatory in 1987 and collected all means for its realization from private and public supporters. The observatory is well known for public astronomical education. He is also the president of the amateur association Sternfreunde Donzdorf in Donzdorf (Src).	JPL · 68947
68948 Mikeoates	2002 PX_{157}	Michael Oates (born 1957), a British amateur astronomer who was the most successful SOHO-comet hunter in 2003. Using his personal computer and fast Internet connections to scan through the SOHO LASCO image archive, he is credited with 138 near-sun comet discoveries (Src).	JPL · 68948

back to top

Preceded by 67,001–68,000	Meanings of minor-planet names List of minor planets: 68,001–69,000	Succeeded by 69,001–70,000
