= Vilnius photometric system =

Photometric system

Vilnius photometric system is a medium-band seven-colour photometric system (UPXYZVS), created in 1963 by Vytautas Straižys and his coworkers. This system was highly optimized for classification of stars from ground-based observations. The system was chosen to be medium-band, to ensure the possibility to measure faint stars.

== Selection of bandpasses ==
The temperature classification of early-type stars is based on Balmer jump (Balmer discontinuity). To measure it one must have two bandpasses placed in the ultraviolet, one beyond the Balmer jump (U magnitude) and another after the jump (X magnitude).

The Y bandpass is near the breakpoint of the interstellar extinction law (interstellar extinction in the 300–800 nm region can be approximated by two straight lines, which intersect at ~435.5 nm).

The P magnitude is placed exactly on the Balmer jump in order to provide separation for luminosity classes of B-A-F stars.

The Z magnitude is placed on the Mg I triplet and the MgH molecular band. It is sensitive to the luminosity classes of G-K-M stars.

The S bandpass coincides with H-alpha line position and provides information about emission or absorption phenomena in that line.

Finally, the V magnitude is chosen to coincide with a similar bandpass in the UBV system. It provides the possibility to relate these two photometric systems.

== Normalization ==
Colour indices of the system were normalized to satisfy the condition:

$U-P = P-X = X-Y = Y-Z = Z-V = V-S =0$

for un-reddened O-type stars.

== Mean wavelength and half-widths of response functions ==
The following table shows the characteristics of each of the filters used (represented colors are only approximate):

Vilnius photometric system filter wavelength and half-width response functions
| | U | P | X | Y | Z | V | S |
|---|---|---|---|---|---|---|---|
| Mean wavelength (nm) | 345 | 374 | 405 | 466 | 516 | 544 | 656 |
| Half-width (nm) | 40 | 26 | 22 | 26 | 21 | 26 | 20 |

== See also ==
UBV photometric system
