= List of minor planets: 68001–69000 =

The following is a partial list of minor planets, running from minor-planet number 68001 through 69000, inclusive. The primary data for this and other partial lists is based on JPL's "Small-Body Orbital Elements" and data available from the Minor Planet Center. Critical list information is also provided by the MPC, unless otherwise specified from Lowell Observatory. A detailed description of the table's columns and additional sources are given on the main page including a complete list of every page in this series, and a statistical break-up on the dynamical classification of minor planets.

Also see the summary list of all named bodies in numerical and alphabetical order, and the corresponding naming citations for the number range of this particular list. New namings may only be added to this list after official publication, as the preannouncement of names is condemned by the Working Group for Small Bodies Nomenclature of the International Astronomical Union.

Near-Earth obj.	MBA (inner)	MBA (outer)	Centaur
Mars-crosser	MBA (middle)	Jupiter trojan	Trans-Neptunian obj.
Unclassified

== 68001–68100 ==
Designation			Discovery			Properties		Ref
Permanent	Provisional	Named after	Date	Site	Discoverer(s)	Category	Diam.	Ref
68001	2000 XS_{33}	—	December 4, 2000	Socorro	LINEAR	V	2.4 km	MPC · JPL
68002	2000 XK_{34}	—	December 4, 2000	Socorro	LINEAR	·	9.8 km	MPC · JPL
68003	2000 XJ_{35}	—	December 4, 2000	Socorro	LINEAR	MAR	3.0 km	MPC · JPL
68004	2000 XD_{38}	—	December 5, 2000	Socorro	LINEAR	PHO	2.5 km	MPC · JPL
68005	2000 XQ_{47}	—	December 4, 2000	Socorro	LINEAR	·	3.5 km	MPC · JPL
68006	2000 XR_{48}	—	December 4, 2000	Socorro	LINEAR	·	2.2 km	MPC · JPL
68007	2000 XD_{52}	—	December 6, 2000	Socorro	LINEAR	·	3.4 km	MPC · JPL
68008	2000 XB_{54}	—	December 5, 2000	Haleakala	NEAT	·	2.1 km	MPC · JPL
68009	2000 YD_{4}	—	December 21, 2000	Zeno	T. Stafford	·	2.4 km	MPC · JPL
68010	2000 YL_{6}	—	December 20, 2000	Socorro	LINEAR	·	1.9 km	MPC · JPL
68011	2000 YK_{7}	—	December 20, 2000	Socorro	LINEAR	V	1.9 km	MPC · JPL
68012	2000 YQ_{7}	—	December 20, 2000	Socorro	LINEAR	·	5.2 km	MPC · JPL
68013	2000 YT_{7}	—	December 21, 2000	Socorro	LINEAR	·	2.8 km	MPC · JPL
68014	2000 YF_{10}	—	December 20, 2000	Socorro	LINEAR	·	10 km	MPC · JPL
68015	2000 YR_{10}	—	December 22, 2000	Socorro	LINEAR	·	2.4 km	MPC · JPL
68016	2000 YW_{10}	—	December 22, 2000	Socorro	LINEAR	MAR	3.0 km	MPC · JPL
68017	2000 YX_{10}	—	December 22, 2000	Socorro	LINEAR	·	2.7 km	MPC · JPL
68018	2000 YQ_{12}	—	December 25, 2000	Oaxaca	Roe, J. M.	·	2.2 km	MPC · JPL
68019	2000 YS_{15}	—	December 22, 2000	Anderson Mesa	LONEOS	·	3.2 km	MPC · JPL
68020	2000 YJ_{17}	—	December 28, 2000	Fountain Hills	C. W. Juels	·	2.3 km	MPC · JPL
68021 Taiki	2000 YU_{17}	Taiki	December 29, 2000	Bisei SG Center	BATTeRS	NYS	2.5 km	MPC · JPL
68022	2000 YP_{18}	—	December 21, 2000	Socorro	LINEAR	·	3.7 km	MPC · JPL
68023	2000 YW_{18}	—	December 21, 2000	Socorro	LINEAR	·	11 km	MPC · JPL
68024	2000 YY_{19}	—	December 22, 2000	Needville	Needville	·	3.1 km	MPC · JPL
68025	2000 YV_{21}	—	December 29, 2000	Desert Beaver	W. K. Y. Yeung	·	4.8 km	MPC · JPL
68026	2000 YU_{24}	—	December 28, 2000	Kitt Peak	Spacewatch	·	7.8 km	MPC · JPL
68027	2000 YN_{26}	—	December 28, 2000	Socorro	LINEAR	·	2.4 km	MPC · JPL
68028	2000 YD_{28}	—	December 26, 2000	Haleakala	NEAT	EUN	2.5 km	MPC · JPL
68029	2000 YG_{28}	—	December 26, 2000	Haleakala	NEAT	·	5.9 km	MPC · JPL
68030	2000 YL_{28}	—	December 29, 2000	Haleakala	NEAT	·	8.3 km	MPC · JPL
68031	2000 YK_{29}	—	December 24, 2000	Haleakala	NEAT	AMO +1km	840 m	MPC · JPL
68032	2000 YV_{30}	—	December 26, 2000	Kitt Peak	Spacewatch	BRA	3.2 km	MPC · JPL
68033	2000 YQ_{32}	—	December 30, 2000	Socorro	LINEAR	·	1.9 km	MPC · JPL
68034	2000 YV_{33}	—	December 28, 2000	Socorro	LINEAR	·	2.9 km	MPC · JPL
68035	2000 YB_{34}	—	December 28, 2000	Socorro	LINEAR	EUN	2.6 km	MPC · JPL
68036	2000 YH_{35}	—	December 30, 2000	Socorro	LINEAR	·	5.0 km	MPC · JPL
68037	2000 YU_{35}	—	December 30, 2000	Socorro	LINEAR	·	2.0 km	MPC · JPL
68038	2000 YP_{39}	—	December 30, 2000	Socorro	LINEAR	·	6.0 km	MPC · JPL
68039	2000 YQ_{39}	—	December 30, 2000	Socorro	LINEAR	·	6.0 km	MPC · JPL
68040	2000 YW_{41}	—	December 30, 2000	Socorro	LINEAR	·	1.6 km	MPC · JPL
68041	2000 YE_{42}	—	December 30, 2000	Socorro	LINEAR	·	1.6 km	MPC · JPL
68042	2000 YR_{42}	—	December 30, 2000	Socorro	LINEAR	·	5.6 km	MPC · JPL
68043	2000 YT_{42}	—	December 30, 2000	Socorro	LINEAR	·	2.0 km	MPC · JPL
68044	2000 YX_{42}	—	December 30, 2000	Socorro	LINEAR	·	3.3 km	MPC · JPL
68045	2000 YN_{44}	—	December 30, 2000	Socorro	LINEAR	MAR	3.0 km	MPC · JPL
68046	2000 YP_{45}	—	December 30, 2000	Socorro	LINEAR	·	3.5 km	MPC · JPL
68047	2000 YK_{47}	—	December 30, 2000	Socorro	LINEAR	·	3.4 km	MPC · JPL
68048	2000 YE_{48}	—	December 30, 2000	Socorro	LINEAR	NYS	2.8 km	MPC · JPL
68049	2000 YK_{49}	—	December 30, 2000	Socorro	LINEAR	·	3.4 km	MPC · JPL
68050	2000 YR_{50}	—	December 30, 2000	Socorro	LINEAR	·	5.8 km	MPC · JPL
68051	2000 YU_{51}	—	December 30, 2000	Socorro	LINEAR	·	2.4 km	MPC · JPL
68052	2000 YD_{52}	—	December 30, 2000	Socorro	LINEAR	MAS	1.9 km	MPC · JPL
68053	2000 YJ_{53}	—	December 30, 2000	Socorro	LINEAR	NYS	2.5 km	MPC · JPL
68054	2000 YQ_{54}	—	December 30, 2000	Socorro	LINEAR	NYS	3.0 km	MPC · JPL
68055	2000 YF_{56}	—	December 30, 2000	Socorro	LINEAR	·	1.8 km	MPC · JPL
68056	2000 YM_{56}	—	December 30, 2000	Socorro	LINEAR	NYS	2.6 km	MPC · JPL
68057	2000 YL_{60}	—	December 30, 2000	Socorro	LINEAR	·	8.2 km	MPC · JPL
68058	2000 YY_{60}	—	December 30, 2000	Socorro	LINEAR	NYS	2.9 km	MPC · JPL
68059	2000 YC_{61}	—	December 30, 2000	Socorro	LINEAR	·	8.4 km	MPC · JPL
68060	2000 YT_{62}	—	December 30, 2000	Socorro	LINEAR	·	9.3 km	MPC · JPL
68061	2000 YF_{63}	—	December 30, 2000	Socorro	LINEAR	·	2.0 km	MPC · JPL
68062	2000 YT_{64}	—	December 28, 2000	Kitt Peak	Spacewatch	·	3.5 km	MPC · JPL
68063	2000 YJ_{66}	—	December 30, 2000	Kitt Peak	Spacewatch	AMO +1km · moon	2.3 km	MPC · JPL
68064	2000 YU_{67}	—	December 28, 2000	Socorro	LINEAR	·	4.3 km	MPC · JPL
68065	2000 YG_{68}	—	December 28, 2000	Socorro	LINEAR	·	3.2 km	MPC · JPL
68066	2000 YE_{71}	—	December 30, 2000	Socorro	LINEAR	NYS	2.2 km	MPC · JPL
68067	2000 YM_{72}	—	December 30, 2000	Socorro	LINEAR	HNS	3.7 km	MPC · JPL
68068	2000 YF_{73}	—	December 30, 2000	Socorro	LINEAR	·	2.8 km	MPC · JPL
68069	2000 YN_{73}	—	December 30, 2000	Socorro	LINEAR	·	3.2 km	MPC · JPL
68070	2000 YR_{73}	—	December 30, 2000	Socorro	LINEAR	·	5.7 km	MPC · JPL
68071	2000 YV_{80}	—	December 30, 2000	Socorro	LINEAR	·	1.9 km	MPC · JPL
68072	2000 YV_{84}	—	December 30, 2000	Socorro	LINEAR	·	2.5 km	MPC · JPL
68073	2000 YZ_{84}	—	December 30, 2000	Socorro	LINEAR	·	3.6 km	MPC · JPL
68074	2000 YH_{85}	—	December 30, 2000	Socorro	LINEAR	·	3.5 km	MPC · JPL
68075	2000 YN_{86}	—	December 30, 2000	Socorro	LINEAR	NYS	6.4 km	MPC · JPL
68076	2000 YT_{87}	—	December 30, 2000	Socorro	LINEAR	·	3.2 km	MPC · JPL
68077	2000 YM_{90}	—	December 30, 2000	Socorro	LINEAR	·	4.3 km	MPC · JPL
68078	2000 YV_{93}	—	December 30, 2000	Socorro	LINEAR	·	5.7 km	MPC · JPL
68079	2000 YM_{95}	—	December 30, 2000	Socorro	LINEAR	·	2.4 km	MPC · JPL
68080	2000 YO_{96}	—	December 30, 2000	Socorro	LINEAR	·	2.4 km	MPC · JPL
68081	2000 YQ_{97}	—	December 30, 2000	Socorro	LINEAR	·	2.8 km	MPC · JPL
68082	2000 YF_{101}	—	December 28, 2000	Socorro	LINEAR	·	2.2 km	MPC · JPL
68083	2000 YH_{101}	—	December 28, 2000	Socorro	LINEAR	·	3.4 km	MPC · JPL
68084	2000 YY_{102}	—	December 28, 2000	Socorro	LINEAR	·	3.4 km	MPC · JPL
68085	2000 YH_{104}	—	December 28, 2000	Socorro	LINEAR	EUP	15 km	MPC · JPL
68086	2000 YX_{104}	—	December 28, 2000	Socorro	LINEAR	·	6.4 km	MPC · JPL
68087	2000 YP_{105}	—	December 28, 2000	Socorro	LINEAR	·	7.2 km	MPC · JPL
68088	2000 YC_{107}	—	December 30, 2000	Socorro	LINEAR	·	2.8 km	MPC · JPL
68089	2000 YS_{108}	—	December 30, 2000	Socorro	LINEAR	NYS	2.2 km	MPC · JPL
68090	2000 YN_{109}	—	December 30, 2000	Socorro	LINEAR	RAF	2.1 km	MPC · JPL
68091	2000 YR_{109}	—	December 30, 2000	Socorro	LINEAR	·	2.6 km	MPC · JPL
68092	2000 YV_{109}	—	December 30, 2000	Socorro	LINEAR	NYS	2.8 km	MPC · JPL
68093	2000 YC_{110}	—	December 30, 2000	Socorro	LINEAR	·	1.6 km	MPC · JPL
68094	2000 YU_{110}	—	December 30, 2000	Socorro	LINEAR	·	2.8 km	MPC · JPL
68095	2000 YJ_{112}	—	December 30, 2000	Socorro	LINEAR	·	2.2 km	MPC · JPL
68096	2000 YW_{113}	—	December 30, 2000	Socorro	LINEAR	·	3.0 km	MPC · JPL
68097	2000 YJ_{115}	—	December 30, 2000	Socorro	LINEAR	·	5.4 km	MPC · JPL
68098	2000 YR_{116}	—	December 30, 2000	Socorro	LINEAR	URS	9.6 km	MPC · JPL
68099	2000 YX_{118}	—	December 27, 2000	Anderson Mesa	LONEOS	·	5.6 km	MPC · JPL
68100	2000 YV_{120}	—	December 20, 2000	Socorro	LINEAR	·	1.4 km	MPC · JPL

== 68101–68200 ==
back to top

Designation			Discovery			Properties		Ref
Permanent	Provisional	Named after	Date	Site	Discoverer(s)	Category	Diam.	Ref
68101	2000 YK_{121}	—	December 22, 2000	Socorro	LINEAR	PHO	2.7 km	MPC · JPL
68102	2000 YZ_{121}	—	December 23, 2000	Socorro	LINEAR	·	2.8 km	MPC · JPL
68103	2000 YM_{122}	—	December 28, 2000	Socorro	LINEAR	EUN	3.1 km	MPC · JPL
68104	2000 YU_{125}	—	December 29, 2000	Anderson Mesa	LONEOS	·	4.8 km	MPC · JPL
68105	2000 YV_{126}	—	December 29, 2000	Anderson Mesa	LONEOS	·	6.5 km	MPC · JPL
68106	2000 YK_{128}	—	December 29, 2000	Haleakala	NEAT	·	3.4 km	MPC · JPL
68107	2000 YG_{132}	—	December 30, 2000	Desert Beaver	W. K. Y. Yeung	·	2.8 km	MPC · JPL
68108	2000 YN_{132}	—	December 30, 2000	Anderson Mesa	LONEOS	MAR	6.0 km	MPC · JPL
68109 Naomipasachoff	2000 YH_{135}	Naomipasachoff	December 17, 2000	Anderson Mesa	LONEOS	·	3.6 km	MPC · JPL
68110	2000 YL_{135}	—	December 17, 2000	Anderson Mesa	LONEOS	·	1.9 km	MPC · JPL
68111	2000 YT_{139}	—	December 27, 2000	Kitt Peak	Spacewatch	·	3.5 km	MPC · JPL
68112	2000 YC_{143}	—	December 19, 2000	Kitt Peak	Spacewatch	L4	20 km	MPC · JPL
68113	2000 YE_{143}	—	December 21, 2000	Socorro	LINEAR	·	2.6 km	MPC · JPL
68114 Deákferenc	2001 AC	Deákferenc	January 1, 2001	Piszkéstető	K. Sárneczky, L. Kiss	·	5.4 km	MPC · JPL
68115	2001 AA_{2}	—	January 3, 2001	Desert Beaver	W. K. Y. Yeung	·	1.9 km	MPC · JPL
68116	2001 AZ_{3}	—	January 2, 2001	Socorro	LINEAR	·	1.9 km	MPC · JPL
68117	2001 AF_{5}	—	January 2, 2001	Socorro	LINEAR	·	4.2 km	MPC · JPL
68118	2001 AO_{5}	—	January 2, 2001	Socorro	LINEAR	(5)	3.8 km	MPC · JPL
68119	2001 AX_{5}	—	January 2, 2001	Socorro	LINEAR	·	4.8 km	MPC · JPL
68120	2001 AT_{10}	—	January 2, 2001	Socorro	LINEAR	·	1.8 km	MPC · JPL
68121	2001 AS_{11}	—	January 2, 2001	Socorro	LINEAR	·	2.7 km	MPC · JPL
68122	2001 AY_{11}	—	January 2, 2001	Socorro	LINEAR	·	2.5 km	MPC · JPL
68123	2001 AU_{12}	—	January 2, 2001	Socorro	LINEAR	·	2.8 km	MPC · JPL
68124	2001 AF_{15}	—	January 2, 2001	Socorro	LINEAR	·	4.6 km	MPC · JPL
68125	2001 AO_{15}	—	January 2, 2001	Socorro	LINEAR	NEM	5.7 km	MPC · JPL
68126	2001 AY_{15}	—	January 2, 2001	Socorro	LINEAR	·	2.6 km	MPC · JPL
68127	2001 AZ_{15}	—	January 2, 2001	Socorro	LINEAR	·	3.0 km	MPC · JPL
68128	2001 AC_{17}	—	January 2, 2001	Socorro	LINEAR	EUN	3.4 km	MPC · JPL
68129	2001 AH_{17}	—	January 2, 2001	Socorro	LINEAR	·	5.6 km	MPC · JPL
68130	2001 AO_{17}	—	January 2, 2001	Socorro	LINEAR	EUN	8.6 km	MPC · JPL
68131	2001 AR_{17}	—	January 2, 2001	Socorro	LINEAR	EOS	5.2 km	MPC · JPL
68132	2001 AG_{18}	—	January 2, 2001	Socorro	LINEAR	·	9.6 km	MPC · JPL
68133	2001 AQ_{18}	—	January 2, 2001	Socorro	LINEAR	·	11 km	MPC · JPL
68134	2001 AT_{18}	—	January 4, 2001	Anderson Mesa	LONEOS	·	4.0 km	MPC · JPL
68135	2001 AJ_{20}	—	January 2, 2001	Socorro	LINEAR	·	4.6 km	MPC · JPL
68136	2001 AZ_{20}	—	January 3, 2001	Socorro	LINEAR	·	3.8 km	MPC · JPL
68137	2001 AF_{24}	—	January 3, 2001	Socorro	LINEAR	·	7.3 km	MPC · JPL
68138	2001 AU_{24}	—	January 4, 2001	Socorro	LINEAR	·	9.0 km	MPC · JPL
68139	2001 AV_{24}	—	January 4, 2001	Socorro	LINEAR	V	2.0 km	MPC · JPL
68140	2001 AA_{27}	—	January 5, 2001	Socorro	LINEAR	·	2.3 km	MPC · JPL
68141	2001 AX_{29}	—	January 4, 2001	Socorro	LINEAR	·	1.9 km	MPC · JPL
68142	2001 AX_{31}	—	January 4, 2001	Socorro	LINEAR	·	3.1 km	MPC · JPL
68143	2001 AK_{36}	—	January 5, 2001	Socorro	LINEAR	·	3.2 km	MPC · JPL
68144 Mizser	2001 AW_{38}	Mizser	January 1, 2001	Piszkéstető	K. Sárneczky, L. Kiss	·	4.0 km	MPC · JPL
68145	2001 AF_{44}	—	January 7, 2001	Socorro	LINEAR	PHO	6.6 km	MPC · JPL
68146	2001 AJ_{44}	—	January 7, 2001	Socorro	LINEAR	·	6.6 km	MPC · JPL
68147	2001 AW_{44}	—	January 15, 2001	Oizumi	T. Kobayashi	TIR	7.4 km	MPC · JPL
68148	2001 AG_{45}	—	January 15, 2001	Oizumi	T. Kobayashi	·	10 km	MPC · JPL
68149	2001 AM_{45}	—	January 4, 2001	Socorro	LINEAR	·	2.3 km	MPC · JPL
68150	2001 AC_{49}	—	January 15, 2001	Socorro	LINEAR	V	1.6 km	MPC · JPL
68151	2001 AO_{49}	—	January 15, 2001	Socorro	LINEAR	·	2.7 km	MPC · JPL
68152	2001 BO	—	January 17, 2001	Oizumi	T. Kobayashi	MAR	2.9 km	MPC · JPL
68153	2001 BV	—	January 17, 2001	Oizumi	T. Kobayashi	V	2.2 km	MPC · JPL
68154	2001 BD_{1}	—	January 16, 2001	Haleakala	NEAT	·	6.2 km	MPC · JPL
68155	2001 BM_{9}	—	January 19, 2001	Socorro	LINEAR	V	1.7 km	MPC · JPL
68156	2001 BE_{11}	—	January 16, 2001	Haleakala	NEAT	·	7.6 km	MPC · JPL
68157	2001 BN_{13}	—	January 21, 2001	Socorro	LINEAR	EOS	4.2 km	MPC · JPL
68158	2001 BV_{14}	—	January 21, 2001	Oizumi	T. Kobayashi	·	5.8 km	MPC · JPL
68159	2001 BJ_{15}	—	January 21, 2001	Oizumi	T. Kobayashi	·	5.8 km	MPC · JPL
68160	2001 BC_{18}	—	January 19, 2001	Socorro	LINEAR	·	2.7 km	MPC · JPL
68161	2001 BQ_{21}	—	January 20, 2001	Socorro	LINEAR	PHO	2.5 km	MPC · JPL
68162	2001 BY_{21}	—	January 20, 2001	Socorro	LINEAR	·	1.6 km	MPC · JPL
68163	2001 BJ_{22}	—	January 20, 2001	Socorro	LINEAR	·	2.1 km	MPC · JPL
68164	2001 BD_{26}	—	January 20, 2001	Socorro	LINEAR	·	6.0 km	MPC · JPL
68165	2001 BH_{28}	—	January 20, 2001	Socorro	LINEAR	·	2.9 km	MPC · JPL
68166	2001 BM_{28}	—	January 20, 2001	Socorro	LINEAR	(194)	3.2 km	MPC · JPL
68167	2001 BV_{28}	—	January 20, 2001	Socorro	LINEAR	·	4.4 km	MPC · JPL
68168	2001 BN_{30}	—	January 20, 2001	Socorro	LINEAR	·	5.1 km	MPC · JPL
68169	2001 BD_{32}	—	January 20, 2001	Socorro	LINEAR	·	4.1 km	MPC · JPL
68170	2001 BS_{32}	—	January 20, 2001	Socorro	LINEAR	·	2.9 km	MPC · JPL
68171	2001 BL_{33}	—	January 20, 2001	Socorro	LINEAR	·	7.1 km	MPC · JPL
68172	2001 BE_{34}	—	January 20, 2001	Socorro	LINEAR	EOS	5.8 km	MPC · JPL
68173	2001 BG_{37}	—	January 21, 2001	Socorro	LINEAR	·	3.7 km	MPC · JPL
68174	2001 BY_{39}	—	January 24, 2001	Haleakala	NEAT	·	4.2 km	MPC · JPL
68175	2001 BL_{45}	—	January 20, 2001	Socorro	LINEAR	·	3.4 km	MPC · JPL
68176	2001 BK_{46}	—	January 21, 2001	Socorro	LINEAR	·	2.9 km	MPC · JPL
68177	2001 BY_{46}	—	January 21, 2001	Socorro	LINEAR	·	4.8 km	MPC · JPL
68178	2001 BJ_{47}	—	January 21, 2001	Socorro	LINEAR	·	6.2 km	MPC · JPL
68179	2001 BO_{47}	—	January 21, 2001	Socorro	LINEAR	·	8.6 km	MPC · JPL
68180	2001 BB_{48}	—	January 21, 2001	Socorro	LINEAR	GEF	5.1 km	MPC · JPL
68181	2001 BK_{49}	—	January 21, 2001	Socorro	LINEAR	EUN	3.7 km	MPC · JPL
68182	2001 BS_{49}	—	January 21, 2001	Socorro	LINEAR	EUN	3.6 km	MPC · JPL
68183	2001 BL_{50}	—	January 24, 2001	Socorro	LINEAR	·	2.9 km	MPC · JPL
68184	2001 BO_{50}	—	January 25, 2001	Farpoint	G. Hug	·	3.8 km	MPC · JPL
68185	2001 BX_{50}	—	January 28, 2001	Oizumi	T. Kobayashi	EUN	3.8 km	MPC · JPL
68186	2001 BZ_{51}	—	January 17, 2001	Kitt Peak	Spacewatch	·	3.6 km	MPC · JPL
68187	2001 BY_{53}	—	January 18, 2001	Haleakala	NEAT	·	3.4 km	MPC · JPL
68188	2001 BZ_{57}	—	January 21, 2001	Socorro	LINEAR	·	3.2 km	MPC · JPL
68189	2001 BC_{58}	—	January 21, 2001	Socorro	LINEAR	·	3.6 km	MPC · JPL
68190	2001 BD_{58}	—	January 21, 2001	Socorro	LINEAR	·	6.5 km	MPC · JPL
68191	2001 BG_{60}	—	January 26, 2001	Socorro	LINEAR	EOS	6.9 km	MPC · JPL
68192	2001 BV_{61}	—	January 31, 2001	Desert Beaver	W. K. Y. Yeung	MAR	4.6 km	MPC · JPL
68193	2001 BA_{62}	—	January 26, 2001	Socorro	LINEAR	EOS	4.1 km	MPC · JPL
68194	2001 BF_{64}	—	January 29, 2001	Socorro	LINEAR	·	2.1 km	MPC · JPL
68195	2001 BT_{64}	—	January 31, 2001	Kitt Peak	Spacewatch	·	7.8 km	MPC · JPL
68196	2001 BP_{65}	—	January 26, 2001	Socorro	LINEAR	EOS	5.8 km	MPC · JPL
68197	2001 BU_{65}	—	January 26, 2001	Socorro	LINEAR	·	10 km	MPC · JPL
68198	2001 BP_{71}	—	January 29, 2001	Socorro	LINEAR	·	5.6 km	MPC · JPL
68199	2001 BL_{74}	—	January 31, 2001	Socorro	LINEAR	·	2.3 km	MPC · JPL
68200	2001 BQ_{76}	—	January 26, 2001	Kitt Peak	Spacewatch	·	5.8 km	MPC · JPL

== 68201–68300 ==
back to top

Designation			Discovery			Properties		Ref
Permanent	Provisional	Named after	Date	Site	Discoverer(s)	Category	Diam.	Ref
68201	2001 BP_{77}	—	January 26, 2001	Haleakala	NEAT	(5)	2.7 km	MPC · JPL
68202	2001 BM_{78}	—	January 24, 2001	Socorro	LINEAR	EOS	4.2 km	MPC · JPL
68203	2001 BC_{80}	—	January 21, 2001	Socorro	LINEAR	MAS	1.9 km	MPC · JPL
68204	2001 BR_{80}	—	January 19, 2001	Socorro	LINEAR	GEF	2.7 km	MPC · JPL
68205	2001 CS	—	February 1, 2001	Socorro	LINEAR	·	8.0 km	MPC · JPL
68206	2001 CX_{2}	—	February 1, 2001	Socorro	LINEAR	·	5.3 km	MPC · JPL
68207	2001 CE_{3}	—	February 1, 2001	Socorro	LINEAR	EOS	5.0 km	MPC · JPL
68208	2001 CX_{3}	—	February 1, 2001	Socorro	LINEAR	·	2.8 km	MPC · JPL
68209	2001 CV_{6}	—	February 1, 2001	Socorro	LINEAR	GEF	4.4 km	MPC · JPL
68210	2001 CQ_{7}	—	February 1, 2001	Socorro	LINEAR	·	7.8 km	MPC · JPL
68211	2001 CH_{12}	—	February 1, 2001	Socorro	LINEAR	EOS	4.4 km	MPC · JPL
68212	2001 CM_{13}	—	February 1, 2001	Socorro	LINEAR	·	10 km	MPC · JPL
68213	2001 CA_{22}	—	February 1, 2001	Anderson Mesa	LONEOS	·	3.1 km	MPC · JPL
68214	2001 CF_{23}	—	February 1, 2001	Anderson Mesa	LONEOS	EOS	3.9 km	MPC · JPL
68215	2001 CK_{25}	—	February 1, 2001	Socorro	LINEAR	NYS	2.3 km	MPC · JPL
68216	2001 CV_{26}	—	February 1, 2001	Socorro	LINEAR	APO +1km · PHA	990 m	MPC · JPL
68217	2001 CX_{26}	—	February 1, 2001	Haleakala	NEAT	·	8.8 km	MPC · JPL
68218 Nealgalt	2001 CO_{31}	Nealgalt	February 12, 2001	Junk Bond	D. Healy	·	3.9 km	MPC · JPL
68219	2001 CJ_{38}	—	February 13, 2001	Socorro	LINEAR	·	8.9 km	MPC · JPL
68220	2001 CT_{38}	—	February 13, 2001	Socorro	LINEAR	PHO	5.1 km	MPC · JPL
68221	2001 CP_{47}	—	February 12, 2001	Anderson Mesa	LONEOS	·	2.6 km	MPC · JPL
68222	2001 CQ_{47}	—	February 12, 2001	Anderson Mesa	LONEOS	·	4.1 km	MPC · JPL
68223	2001 DJ	—	February 16, 2001	Desert Beaver	W. K. Y. Yeung	·	9.5 km	MPC · JPL
68224	2001 DG_{11}	—	February 17, 2001	Socorro	LINEAR	EOS	5.0 km	MPC · JPL
68225	2001 DV_{12}	—	February 17, 2001	Socorro	LINEAR	·	5.0 km	MPC · JPL
68226	2001 DM_{18}	—	February 16, 2001	Socorro	LINEAR	·	3.3 km	MPC · JPL
68227	2001 DZ_{20}	—	February 16, 2001	Socorro	LINEAR	·	7.4 km	MPC · JPL
68228	2001 DD_{22}	—	February 16, 2001	Socorro	LINEAR	·	4.6 km	MPC · JPL
68229	2001 DL_{30}	—	February 17, 2001	Socorro	LINEAR	·	2.1 km	MPC · JPL
68230	2001 DT_{32}	—	February 17, 2001	Socorro	LINEAR	·	7.0 km	MPC · JPL
68231	2001 DO_{33}	—	February 17, 2001	Socorro	LINEAR	EUN	4.9 km	MPC · JPL
68232	2001 DM_{35}	—	February 19, 2001	Socorro	LINEAR	GEF	3.9 km	MPC · JPL
68233	2001 DY_{35}	—	February 19, 2001	Socorro	LINEAR	·	2.6 km	MPC · JPL
68234	2001 DM_{38}	—	February 19, 2001	Socorro	LINEAR	NAE	7.3 km	MPC · JPL
68235	2001 DV_{38}	—	February 19, 2001	Socorro	LINEAR	·	5.5 km	MPC · JPL
68236	2001 DZ_{39}	—	February 19, 2001	Socorro	LINEAR	·	2.5 km	MPC · JPL
68237	2001 DB_{40}	—	February 19, 2001	Socorro	LINEAR	·	2.3 km	MPC · JPL
68238	2001 DP_{40}	—	February 19, 2001	Socorro	LINEAR	·	3.3 km	MPC · JPL
68239	2001 DB_{47}	—	February 19, 2001	Socorro	LINEAR	·	2.0 km	MPC · JPL
68240	2001 DW_{55}	—	February 16, 2001	Kitt Peak	Spacewatch	·	5.6 km	MPC · JPL
68241	2001 DT_{59}	—	February 19, 2001	Socorro	LINEAR	·	2.4 km	MPC · JPL
68242	2001 DW_{59}	—	February 19, 2001	Socorro	LINEAR	V	2.0 km	MPC · JPL
68243	2001 DO_{60}	—	February 19, 2001	Socorro	LINEAR	HOF	4.8 km	MPC · JPL
68244	2001 DM_{68}	—	February 19, 2001	Socorro	LINEAR	·	8.5 km	MPC · JPL
68245	2001 DQ_{68}	—	February 19, 2001	Socorro	LINEAR	·	6.4 km	MPC · JPL
68246	2001 DS_{70}	—	February 19, 2001	Socorro	LINEAR	·	1.5 km	MPC · JPL
68247	2001 DV_{70}	—	February 19, 2001	Socorro	LINEAR	3:2 · SHU	14 km	MPC · JPL
68248	2001 DY_{71}	—	February 19, 2001	Socorro	LINEAR	VER	8.1 km	MPC · JPL
68249	2001 DY_{73}	—	February 19, 2001	Socorro	LINEAR	·	2.6 km	MPC · JPL
68250	2001 DZ_{73}	—	February 19, 2001	Socorro	LINEAR	MAR	3.7 km	MPC · JPL
68251	2001 DT_{75}	—	February 20, 2001	Socorro	LINEAR	EOS	5.0 km	MPC · JPL
68252	2001 DP_{89}	—	February 22, 2001	Socorro	LINEAR	·	4.0 km	MPC · JPL
68253	2001 DV_{97}	—	February 17, 2001	Socorro	LINEAR	EOS	4.7 km	MPC · JPL
68254	2001 DH_{98}	—	February 17, 2001	Socorro	LINEAR	·	3.8 km	MPC · JPL
68255	2001 DP_{99}	—	February 17, 2001	Socorro	LINEAR	·	3.4 km	MPC · JPL
68256	2001 DE_{100}	—	February 17, 2001	Haleakala	NEAT	·	2.5 km	MPC · JPL
68257	2001 DH_{100}	—	February 17, 2001	Haleakala	NEAT	·	14 km	MPC · JPL
68258	2001 DD_{103}	—	February 16, 2001	Socorro	LINEAR	·	5.0 km	MPC · JPL
68259	2001 DC_{104}	—	February 16, 2001	Anderson Mesa	LONEOS	·	7.7 km	MPC · JPL
68260	2001 DV_{107}	—	February 22, 2001	Haleakala	NEAT	·	7.9 km	MPC · JPL
68261	2001 EU	—	March 2, 2001	Haleakala	NEAT	·	7.5 km	MPC · JPL
68262	2001 EW_{9}	—	March 4, 2001	Socorro	LINEAR	·	3.5 km	MPC · JPL
68263	2001 EW_{12}	—	March 14, 2001	Prescott	P. G. Comba	·	4.4 km	MPC · JPL
68264	2001 EQ_{13}	—	March 11, 2001	Haleakala	NEAT	·	3.4 km	MPC · JPL
68265	2001 EK_{14}	—	March 15, 2001	Socorro	LINEAR	EUN	3.7 km	MPC · JPL
68266	2001 ES_{14}	—	March 15, 2001	Socorro	LINEAR	URS	7.6 km	MPC · JPL
68267	2001 EA_{16}	—	March 4, 2001	Haleakala	NEAT	APO +1km	880 m	MPC · JPL
68268	2001 EX_{18}	—	March 14, 2001	Anderson Mesa	LONEOS	EOS	6.3 km	MPC · JPL
68269	2001 EY_{19}	—	March 15, 2001	Anderson Mesa	LONEOS	·	4.0 km	MPC · JPL
68270	2001 EA_{21}	—	March 15, 2001	Anderson Mesa	LONEOS	·	4.8 km	MPC · JPL
68271	2001 EB_{21}	—	March 15, 2001	Anderson Mesa	LONEOS	·	7.5 km	MPC · JPL
68272	2001 EG_{24}	—	March 15, 2001	Haleakala	NEAT	·	3.1 km	MPC · JPL
68273	2001 EQ_{26}	—	March 2, 2001	Anderson Mesa	LONEOS	·	8.1 km	MPC · JPL
68274	2001 FJ_{2}	—	March 18, 2001	Socorro	LINEAR	·	5.2 km	MPC · JPL
68275	2001 FE_{3}	—	March 18, 2001	Socorro	LINEAR	NYS	2.4 km	MPC · JPL
68276	2001 FG_{3}	—	March 18, 2001	Socorro	LINEAR	EOS	5.0 km	MPC · JPL
68277	2001 FQ_{3}	—	March 18, 2001	Socorro	LINEAR	V	1.5 km	MPC · JPL
68278	2001 FC_{7}	—	March 18, 2001	Kitt Peak	Spacewatch	AMO	940 m	MPC · JPL
68279	2001 FD_{8}	—	March 18, 2001	Socorro	LINEAR	NYS ·	3.2 km	MPC · JPL
68280	2001 FR_{8}	—	March 18, 2001	Socorro	LINEAR	EUN · slow	6.1 km	MPC · JPL
68281	2001 FZ_{11}	—	March 19, 2001	Anderson Mesa	LONEOS	·	3.0 km	MPC · JPL
68282	2001 FR_{14}	—	March 19, 2001	Anderson Mesa	LONEOS	·	6.6 km	MPC · JPL
68283	2001 FE_{17}	—	March 19, 2001	Anderson Mesa	LONEOS	HYG	8.4 km	MPC · JPL
68284	2001 FJ_{17}	—	March 19, 2001	Anderson Mesa	LONEOS	BAR	3.8 km	MPC · JPL
68285	2001 FQ_{18}	—	March 19, 2001	Anderson Mesa	LONEOS	·	7.9 km	MPC · JPL
68286	2001 FP_{22}	—	March 21, 2001	Anderson Mesa	LONEOS	fast	9.9 km	MPC · JPL
68287	2001 FL_{24}	—	March 17, 2001	Socorro	LINEAR	3:2	13 km	MPC · JPL
68288	2001 FH_{26}	—	March 18, 2001	Socorro	LINEAR	·	5.0 km	MPC · JPL
68289	2001 FM_{26}	—	March 18, 2001	Socorro	LINEAR	HNS	4.1 km	MPC · JPL
68290	2001 FT_{33}	—	March 18, 2001	Socorro	LINEAR	·	3.0 km	MPC · JPL
68291	2001 FM_{36}	—	March 18, 2001	Socorro	LINEAR	VER	6.2 km	MPC · JPL
68292	2001 FS_{37}	—	March 18, 2001	Socorro	LINEAR	·	5.6 km	MPC · JPL
68293	2001 FF_{49}	—	March 18, 2001	Socorro	LINEAR	EUN	3.9 km	MPC · JPL
68294	2001 FN_{49}	—	March 18, 2001	Socorro	LINEAR	·	9.8 km	MPC · JPL
68295	2001 FY_{52}	—	March 18, 2001	Socorro	LINEAR	·	8.4 km	MPC · JPL
68296	2001 FN_{75}	—	March 19, 2001	Socorro	LINEAR	·	2.6 km	MPC · JPL
68297	2001 FH_{78}	—	March 19, 2001	Socorro	LINEAR	(1118)	11 km	MPC · JPL
68298	2001 FC_{80}	—	March 21, 2001	Socorro	LINEAR	·	2.4 km	MPC · JPL
68299	2001 FH_{82}	—	March 23, 2001	Socorro	LINEAR	·	7.1 km	MPC · JPL
68300	2001 FD_{95}	—	March 16, 2001	Socorro	LINEAR	·	10 km	MPC · JPL

== 68301–68400 ==
back to top

Designation			Discovery			Properties		Ref
Permanent	Provisional	Named after	Date	Site	Discoverer(s)	Category	Diam.	Ref
68301	2001 FZ_{95}	—	March 16, 2001	Socorro	LINEAR	V	1.8 km	MPC · JPL
68302	2001 FH_{96}	—	March 16, 2001	Socorro	LINEAR	·	6.3 km	MPC · JPL
68303	2001 FB_{97}	—	March 16, 2001	Socorro	LINEAR	fast	5.4 km	MPC · JPL
68304	2001 FO_{97}	—	March 16, 2001	Socorro	LINEAR	·	11 km	MPC · JPL
68305	2001 FK_{103}	—	March 18, 2001	Socorro	LINEAR	·	11 km	MPC · JPL
68306	2001 FU_{103}	—	March 18, 2001	Socorro	LINEAR	·	3.5 km	MPC · JPL
68307	2001 FL_{104}	—	March 18, 2001	Anderson Mesa	LONEOS	·	5.8 km	MPC · JPL
68308	2001 FF_{106}	—	March 18, 2001	Anderson Mesa	LONEOS	·	6.7 km	MPC · JPL
68309	2001 FM_{107}	—	March 18, 2001	Anderson Mesa	LONEOS	·	1.2 km	MPC · JPL
68310	2001 FH_{112}	—	March 18, 2001	Socorro	LINEAR	·	4.5 km	MPC · JPL
68311	2001 FN_{112}	—	March 18, 2001	Haleakala	NEAT	EOS	4.1 km	MPC · JPL
68312	2001 FV_{117}	—	March 19, 2001	Haleakala	NEAT	·	7.2 km	MPC · JPL
68313	2001 FK_{118}	—	March 20, 2001	Haleakala	NEAT	·	6.8 km	MPC · JPL
68314	2001 FD_{120}	—	March 28, 2001	Kitt Peak	Spacewatch	THM	7.1 km	MPC · JPL
68315	2001 FT_{144}	—	March 23, 2001	Haleakala	NEAT	EUP	8.0 km	MPC · JPL
68316	2001 FG_{145}	—	March 23, 2001	Haleakala	NEAT	AEG	8.2 km	MPC · JPL
68317	2001 FB_{151}	—	March 24, 2001	Anderson Mesa	LONEOS	EUN	3.8 km	MPC · JPL
68318	2001 FX_{152}	—	March 26, 2001	Socorro	LINEAR	·	2.6 km	MPC · JPL
68319	2001 FA_{156}	—	March 26, 2001	Haleakala	NEAT	·	4.1 km	MPC · JPL
68320	2001 FY_{159}	—	March 29, 2001	Anderson Mesa	LONEOS	·	6.0 km	MPC · JPL
68321	2001 FF_{169}	—	March 23, 2001	Anderson Mesa	LONEOS	EOS	4.8 km	MPC · JPL
68322	2001 FN_{175}	—	March 31, 2001	Socorro	LINEAR	·	5.8 km	MPC · JPL
68323	2001 FZ_{180}	—	March 21, 2001	Kitt Peak	Spacewatch	·	4.6 km	MPC · JPL
68324	2001 FX_{182}	—	March 25, 2001	Kitt Peak	M. W. Buie	·	4.1 km	MPC · JPL
68325 Begues	2001 HO_{16}	Begues	April 23, 2001	Begues	Manteca, J.	·	4.5 km	MPC · JPL
68326	2001 HD_{21}	—	April 23, 2001	Socorro	LINEAR	·	1.7 km	MPC · JPL
68327	2001 HW_{35}	—	April 29, 2001	Socorro	LINEAR	·	7.1 km	MPC · JPL
68328	2001 HS_{44}	—	April 16, 2001	Anderson Mesa	LONEOS	·	4.0 km	MPC · JPL
68329	2001 HV_{48}	—	April 21, 2001	Socorro	LINEAR	PHO	3.3 km	MPC · JPL
68330	2001 HW_{48}	—	April 21, 2001	Socorro	LINEAR	·	5.3 km	MPC · JPL
68331	2001 HM_{58}	—	April 25, 2001	Haleakala	NEAT	·	9.4 km	MPC · JPL
68332	2001 KO	—	May 17, 2001	Socorro	LINEAR	GEF	2.8 km	MPC · JPL
68333	2001 KA_{7}	—	May 17, 2001	Socorro	LINEAR	·	2.4 km	MPC · JPL
68334	2001 KG_{9}	—	May 18, 2001	Socorro	LINEAR	·	2.9 km	MPC · JPL
68335	2001 KQ_{9}	—	May 18, 2001	Socorro	LINEAR	·	2.9 km	MPC · JPL
68336	2001 KH_{18}	—	May 23, 2001	Socorro	LINEAR	·	3.3 km	MPC · JPL
68337	2001 KU_{20}	—	May 17, 2001	Socorro	LINEAR	·	2.0 km	MPC · JPL
68338	2001 KD_{23}	—	May 17, 2001	Socorro	LINEAR	MAS	1.8 km	MPC · JPL
68339	2001 KR_{24}	—	May 17, 2001	Socorro	LINEAR	·	4.9 km	MPC · JPL
68340	2001 KP_{26}	—	May 17, 2001	Socorro	LINEAR	MIS	5.0 km	MPC · JPL
68341	2001 KL_{45}	—	May 22, 2001	Socorro	LINEAR	·	4.4 km	MPC · JPL
68342	2001 KF_{46}	—	May 22, 2001	Socorro	LINEAR	V	1.6 km	MPC · JPL
68343	2001 KB_{47}	—	May 22, 2001	Socorro	LINEAR	·	3.5 km	MPC · JPL
68344	2001 KG_{51}	—	May 24, 2001	Socorro	LINEAR	·	2.1 km	MPC · JPL
68345	2001 KP_{65}	—	May 22, 2001	Anderson Mesa	LONEOS	·	3.6 km	MPC · JPL
68346	2001 KZ_{66}	—	May 29, 2001	Haleakala	NEAT	APO +1km · PHA	740 m	MPC · JPL
68347	2001 KB_{67}	—	May 30, 2001	Socorro	LINEAR	ATE · PHA	370 m	MPC · JPL
68348	2001 LO_{7}	—	June 15, 2001	Socorro	LINEAR	APO +1km	3.5 km	MPC · JPL
68349	2001 LD_{17}	—	June 15, 2001	Socorro	LINEAR	EUN	3.6 km	MPC · JPL
68350	2001 MK_{3}	—	June 20, 2001	Socorro	LINEAR	AMO +1km	1.8 km	MPC · JPL
68351	2001 MS_{4}	—	June 17, 2001	Palomar	NEAT	·	3.3 km	MPC · JPL
68352	2001 MH_{6}	—	June 21, 2001	Palomar	NEAT	·	7.3 km	MPC · JPL
68353	2001 MS_{10}	—	June 21, 2001	Palomar	NEAT	·	5.3 km	MPC · JPL
68354	2001 MN_{27}	—	June 20, 2001	Anderson Mesa	LONEOS	·	7.5 km	MPC · JPL
68355	2001 NZ	—	July 12, 2001	Palomar	NEAT	EUN ·	6.1 km	MPC · JPL
68356	2001 NH_{12}	—	July 13, 2001	Haleakala	NEAT	·	3.9 km	MPC · JPL
68357	2001 NY_{18}	—	July 13, 2001	Palomar	NEAT	·	3.1 km	MPC · JPL
68358	2001 NT_{19}	—	July 12, 2001	Haleakala	NEAT	·	6.8 km	MPC · JPL
68359	2001 OZ_{13}	—	July 19, 2001	Palomar	NEAT	AMO +1km	860 m	MPC · JPL
68360	2001 OK_{24}	—	July 16, 2001	Anderson Mesa	LONEOS	·	5.3 km	MPC · JPL
68361	2001 OX_{32}	—	July 19, 2001	Palomar	NEAT	·	2.7 km	MPC · JPL
68362	2001 OP_{38}	—	July 20, 2001	Palomar	NEAT	MAR	7.6 km	MPC · JPL
68363	2001 OR_{49}	—	July 17, 2001	Anderson Mesa	LONEOS	·	17 km	MPC · JPL
68364	2001 OA_{60}	—	July 21, 2001	Haleakala	NEAT	·	2.4 km	MPC · JPL
68365	2001 OQ_{61}	—	July 21, 2001	Haleakala	NEAT	·	1.5 km	MPC · JPL
68366	2001 OF_{67}	—	July 26, 2001	Palomar	NEAT	(5)	2.3 km	MPC · JPL
68367	2001 ON_{88}	—	July 21, 2001	Haleakala	NEAT	·	7.5 km	MPC · JPL
68368	2001 ON_{102}	—	July 28, 2001	Haleakala	NEAT	·	2.7 km	MPC · JPL
68369	2001 OT_{105}	—	July 29, 2001	Socorro	LINEAR	·	4.9 km	MPC · JPL
68370	2001 OM_{107}	—	July 29, 2001	Socorro	LINEAR	TIR	7.1 km	MPC · JPL
68371	2001 OO_{107}	—	July 29, 2001	Anderson Mesa	LONEOS	·	2.2 km	MPC · JPL
68372	2001 PM_{9}	—	August 11, 2001	Palomar	NEAT	APO · PHA	580 m	MPC · JPL
68373	2001 PP_{13}	—	August 13, 2001	Reedy Creek	J. Broughton	·	1.8 km	MPC · JPL
68374	2001 PM_{14}	—	August 14, 2001	Reedy Creek	J. Broughton	HIL · 3:2	10 km	MPC · JPL
68375	2001 PZ_{22}	—	August 10, 2001	Haleakala	NEAT	·	2.8 km	MPC · JPL
68376	2001 PC_{23}	—	August 10, 2001	Haleakala	NEAT	·	2.5 km	MPC · JPL
68377	2001 PD_{27}	—	August 11, 2001	Haleakala	NEAT	·	1.4 km	MPC · JPL
68378	2001 PK_{37}	—	August 11, 2001	Palomar	NEAT	·	3.9 km	MPC · JPL
68379	2001 PN_{42}	—	August 12, 2001	Palomar	NEAT	EOS	4.9 km	MPC · JPL
68380	2001 PZ_{61}	—	August 13, 2001	Haleakala	NEAT	·	4.0 km	MPC · JPL
68381	2001 PA_{63}	—	August 13, 2001	Haleakala	NEAT	·	5.6 km	MPC · JPL
68382	2001 QK_{10}	—	August 16, 2001	Socorro	LINEAR	·	5.9 km	MPC · JPL
68383	2001 QW_{10}	—	August 16, 2001	Socorro	LINEAR	·	1.4 km	MPC · JPL
68384	2001 QS_{12}	—	August 16, 2001	Socorro	LINEAR	·	3.9 km	MPC · JPL
68385	2001 QM_{24}	—	August 16, 2001	Socorro	LINEAR	KOR	3.3 km	MPC · JPL
68386	2001 QJ_{31}	—	August 16, 2001	Socorro	LINEAR	·	3.1 km	MPC · JPL
68387	2001 QF_{32}	—	August 17, 2001	Socorro	LINEAR	H	1.0 km	MPC · JPL
68388	2001 QX_{42}	—	August 16, 2001	Socorro	LINEAR	·	2.0 km	MPC · JPL
68389	2001 QE_{44}	—	August 16, 2001	Socorro	LINEAR	·	3.5 km	MPC · JPL
68390	2001 QZ_{46}	—	August 16, 2001	Socorro	LINEAR	(5)	2.2 km	MPC · JPL
68391	2001 QO_{55}	—	August 16, 2001	Socorro	LINEAR	WIT	2.8 km	MPC · JPL
68392	2001 QW_{57}	—	August 16, 2001	Socorro	LINEAR	KOR	3.6 km	MPC · JPL
68393	2001 QT_{65}	—	August 17, 2001	Socorro	LINEAR	·	3.4 km	MPC · JPL
68394	2001 QZ_{68}	—	August 17, 2001	Socorro	LINEAR	·	1.9 km	MPC · JPL
68395	2001 QH_{74}	—	August 16, 2001	Socorro	LINEAR	·	7.2 km	MPC · JPL
68396	2001 QZ_{75}	—	August 16, 2001	Socorro	LINEAR	·	3.5 km	MPC · JPL
68397	2001 QP_{82}	—	August 17, 2001	Socorro	LINEAR	·	8.9 km	MPC · JPL
68398	2001 QV_{85}	—	August 22, 2001	Desert Eagle	W. K. Y. Yeung	·	2.2 km	MPC · JPL
68399	2001 QS_{89}	—	August 16, 2001	Palomar	NEAT	·	3.0 km	MPC · JPL
68400	2001 QM_{91}	—	August 16, 2001	Socorro	LINEAR	EOS · slow	5.3 km	MPC · JPL

== 68401–68500 ==
back to top

Designation			Discovery			Properties		Ref
Permanent	Provisional	Named after	Date	Site	Discoverer(s)	Category	Diam.	Ref
68401	2001 QX_{92}	—	August 22, 2001	Socorro	LINEAR	·	1.7 km	MPC · JPL
68402	2001 QM_{98}	—	August 19, 2001	Socorro	LINEAR	HIL · 3:2	10 km	MPC · JPL
68403	2001 QH_{105}	—	August 23, 2001	Socorro	LINEAR	·	1.5 km	MPC · JPL
68404	2001 QX_{108}	—	August 19, 2001	Haleakala	NEAT	·	7.7 km	MPC · JPL
68405	2001 QN_{125}	—	August 19, 2001	Socorro	LINEAR	·	3.0 km	MPC · JPL
68406	2001 QU_{130}	—	August 20, 2001	Socorro	LINEAR	V	1.5 km	MPC · JPL
68407	2001 QN_{131}	—	August 20, 2001	Socorro	LINEAR	·	3.0 km	MPC · JPL
68408	2001 QH_{137}	—	August 22, 2001	Socorro	LINEAR	·	3.4 km	MPC · JPL
68409	2001 QS_{148}	—	August 20, 2001	Haleakala	NEAT	·	5.1 km	MPC · JPL
68410 Nichols	2001 QB_{154}	Nichols	August 16, 2001	OCA-Anza	M. Collins, White, M.	·	2.3 km	MPC · JPL
68411	2001 QE_{188}	—	August 21, 2001	Haleakala	NEAT	·	3.3 km	MPC · JPL
68412	2001 QL_{188}	—	August 22, 2001	Kitt Peak	Spacewatch	·	2.2 km	MPC · JPL
68413	2001 QB_{196}	—	August 22, 2001	Haleakala	NEAT	·	6.6 km	MPC · JPL
68414	2001 QZ_{219}	—	August 23, 2001	Socorro	LINEAR	·	3.1 km	MPC · JPL
68415	2001 QG_{220}	—	August 23, 2001	Socorro	LINEAR	·	3.6 km	MPC · JPL
68416	2001 QQ_{220}	—	August 24, 2001	Anderson Mesa	LONEOS	·	2.4 km	MPC · JPL
68417	2001 QD_{238}	—	August 24, 2001	Socorro	LINEAR	·	3.0 km	MPC · JPL
68418	2001 QN_{244}	—	August 24, 2001	Socorro	LINEAR	·	2.1 km	MPC · JPL
68419	2001 QE_{256}	—	August 25, 2001	Socorro	LINEAR	MRX	2.7 km	MPC · JPL
68420	2001 QO_{258}	—	August 25, 2001	Socorro	LINEAR	·	5.7 km	MPC · JPL
68421	2001 QY_{270}	—	August 19, 2001	Socorro	LINEAR	·	2.8 km	MPC · JPL
68422	2001 QJ_{296}	—	August 24, 2001	Socorro	LINEAR	KOR	4.2 km	MPC · JPL
68423	2001 QD_{315}	—	August 20, 2001	Cerro Tololo	M. W. Buie	·	2.4 km	MPC · JPL
68424	2001 QO_{327}	—	August 16, 2001	Socorro	LINEAR	·	1.8 km	MPC · JPL
68425	2001 QS_{329}	—	August 24, 2001	Anderson Mesa	LONEOS	·	2.4 km	MPC · JPL
68426	2001 RE	—	September 2, 2001	Palomar	NEAT	·	7.2 km	MPC · JPL
68427	2001 RK_{6}	—	September 10, 2001	Desert Eagle	W. K. Y. Yeung	·	3.6 km	MPC · JPL
68428	2001 RA_{21}	—	September 7, 2001	Socorro	LINEAR	·	6.0 km	MPC · JPL
68429	2001 RW_{24}	—	September 7, 2001	Socorro	LINEAR	·	5.6 km	MPC · JPL
68430	2001 RB_{37}	—	September 8, 2001	Socorro	LINEAR	(2076)	1.5 km	MPC · JPL
68431	2001 RH_{48}	—	September 11, 2001	Desert Eagle	W. K. Y. Yeung	BAP	2.0 km	MPC · JPL
68432	2001 RX_{57}	—	September 12, 2001	Socorro	LINEAR	HYG	6.3 km	MPC · JPL
68433	2001 RN_{69}	—	September 10, 2001	Socorro	LINEAR	·	5.0 km	MPC · JPL
68434	2001 RZ_{76}	—	September 10, 2001	Socorro	LINEAR	·	4.7 km	MPC · JPL
68435	2001 RF_{81}	—	September 14, 2001	Palomar	NEAT	·	2.0 km	MPC · JPL
68436	2001 RC_{85}	—	September 11, 2001	Anderson Mesa	LONEOS	·	4.1 km	MPC · JPL
68437	2001 RQ_{87}	—	September 11, 2001	Anderson Mesa	LONEOS	(5)	2.1 km	MPC · JPL
68438	2001 RJ_{99}	—	September 12, 2001	Socorro	LINEAR	NYS	2.4 km	MPC · JPL
68439	2001 RB_{104}	—	September 12, 2001	Socorro	LINEAR	·	5.6 km	MPC · JPL
68440	2001 RN_{107}	—	September 12, 2001	Socorro	LINEAR	KOR	3.3 km	MPC · JPL
68441	2001 RJ_{114}	—	September 12, 2001	Socorro	LINEAR	·	4.5 km	MPC · JPL
68442	2001 RO_{132}	—	September 12, 2001	Socorro	LINEAR	·	2.9 km	MPC · JPL
68443	2001 RP_{133}	—	September 12, 2001	Socorro	LINEAR	·	2.4 km	MPC · JPL
68444	2001 RH_{142}	—	September 11, 2001	Socorro	LINEAR	L5	28 km	MPC · JPL
68445	2001 RF_{147}	—	September 9, 2001	Anderson Mesa	LONEOS	·	8.0 km	MPC · JPL
68446	2001 RN_{148}	—	September 10, 2001	Anderson Mesa	LONEOS	V	1.5 km	MPC · JPL
68447	2001 RP_{148}	—	September 10, 2001	Anderson Mesa	LONEOS	·	8.3 km	MPC · JPL
68448 Sidneywolff	2001 SW_{4}	Sidneywolff	September 18, 2001	Fountain Hills	C. W. Juels, P. R. Holvorcem	·	2.4 km	MPC · JPL
68449	2001 SP_{20}	—	September 16, 2001	Socorro	LINEAR	·	3.2 km	MPC · JPL
68450	2001 SN_{26}	—	September 16, 2001	Socorro	LINEAR	·	2.1 km	MPC · JPL
68451	2001 SZ_{31}	—	September 16, 2001	Socorro	LINEAR	THM	6.9 km	MPC · JPL
68452	2001 SA_{36}	—	September 16, 2001	Socorro	LINEAR	KOR · fast	3.5 km	MPC · JPL
68453	2001 SK_{36}	—	September 16, 2001	Socorro	LINEAR	·	4.2 km	MPC · JPL
68454	2001 SS_{46}	—	September 16, 2001	Socorro	LINEAR	·	2.6 km	MPC · JPL
68455	2001 SH_{47}	—	September 16, 2001	Socorro	LINEAR	·	1.5 km	MPC · JPL
68456	2001 SJ_{57}	—	September 16, 2001	Socorro	LINEAR	·	5.0 km	MPC · JPL
68457	2001 SC_{63}	—	September 17, 2001	Socorro	LINEAR	·	5.6 km	MPC · JPL
68458	2001 SQ_{69}	—	September 17, 2001	Socorro	LINEAR	V	1.3 km	MPC · JPL
68459	2001 SY_{80}	—	September 20, 2001	Socorro	LINEAR	·	3.1 km	MPC · JPL
68460	2001 SS_{104}	—	September 20, 2001	Socorro	LINEAR	V	1.5 km	MPC · JPL
68461	2001 SO_{107}	—	September 20, 2001	Socorro	LINEAR	EOS	5.9 km	MPC · JPL
68462	2001 SW_{108}	—	September 20, 2001	Socorro	LINEAR	EUN	3.9 km	MPC · JPL
68463	2001 SQ_{120}	—	September 16, 2001	Socorro	LINEAR	·	2.4 km	MPC · JPL
68464	2001 SW_{128}	—	September 16, 2001	Socorro	LINEAR	·	2.5 km	MPC · JPL
68465	2001 SZ_{131}	—	September 16, 2001	Socorro	LINEAR	NYS	2.5 km	MPC · JPL
68466	2001 SC_{150}	—	September 17, 2001	Socorro	LINEAR	·	3.1 km	MPC · JPL
68467	2001 SW_{160}	—	September 17, 2001	Socorro	LINEAR	HNS	2.5 km	MPC · JPL
68468	2001 SZ_{224}	—	September 19, 2001	Socorro	LINEAR	·	1.8 km	MPC · JPL
68469	2001 SC_{253}	—	September 19, 2001	Socorro	LINEAR	·	5.3 km	MPC · JPL
68470	2001 SP_{266}	—	September 25, 2001	Desert Eagle	W. K. Y. Yeung	·	3.4 km	MPC · JPL
68471	2001 ST_{276}	—	September 21, 2001	Palomar	NEAT	·	3.6 km	MPC · JPL
68472	2001 SL_{282}	—	September 28, 2001	Farpoint	G. Hug	CLO	5.8 km	MPC · JPL
68473	2001 SC_{289}	—	September 23, 2001	Goodricke-Pigott	R. A. Tucker	·	5.6 km	MPC · JPL
68474	2001 SL_{328}	—	September 19, 2001	Kitt Peak	Spacewatch	·	1.5 km	MPC · JPL
68475	2001 SD_{349}	—	September 21, 2001	Socorro	LINEAR	·	5.7 km	MPC · JPL
68476	2001 TJ_{9}	—	October 11, 2001	Socorro	LINEAR	·	6.0 km	MPC · JPL
68477	2001 TD_{10}	—	October 13, 2001	Socorro	LINEAR	·	2.9 km	MPC · JPL
68478	2001 TR_{26}	—	October 14, 2001	Socorro	LINEAR	·	2.3 km	MPC · JPL
68479	2001 TX_{40}	—	October 14, 2001	Socorro	LINEAR	·	3.1 km	MPC · JPL
68480	2001 TQ_{49}	—	October 15, 2001	Desert Eagle	W. K. Y. Yeung	·	4.0 km	MPC · JPL
68481	2001 TQ_{95}	—	October 14, 2001	Socorro	LINEAR	·	2.5 km	MPC · JPL
68482	2001 TA_{110}	—	October 14, 2001	Socorro	LINEAR	·	2.7 km	MPC · JPL
68483	2001 TG_{129}	—	October 14, 2001	Kitt Peak	Spacewatch	NYS · fast	3.1 km	MPC · JPL
68484	2001 TB_{141}	—	October 10, 2001	Palomar	NEAT	·	1.8 km	MPC · JPL
68485	2001 TD_{144}	—	October 10, 2001	Palomar	NEAT	·	1.5 km	MPC · JPL
68486	2001 TM_{169}	—	October 15, 2001	Socorro	LINEAR	·	2.8 km	MPC · JPL
68487	2001 TM_{175}	—	October 14, 2001	Socorro	LINEAR	EUN	2.7 km	MPC · JPL
68488	2001 TK_{209}	—	October 12, 2001	Haleakala	NEAT	·	5.3 km	MPC · JPL
68489	2001 TS_{212}	—	October 13, 2001	Anderson Mesa	LONEOS	·	2.9 km	MPC · JPL
68490	2001 TH_{239}	—	October 15, 2001	Palomar	NEAT	·	2.3 km	MPC · JPL
68491	2001 UF_{4}	—	October 17, 2001	Desert Eagle	W. K. Y. Yeung	·	1.9 km	MPC · JPL
68492	2001 UH_{4}	—	October 17, 2001	Desert Eagle	W. K. Y. Yeung	·	3.3 km	MPC · JPL
68493	2001 US_{9}	—	October 17, 2001	Socorro	LINEAR	·	2.9 km	MPC · JPL
68494	2001 UT_{9}	—	October 17, 2001	Socorro	LINEAR	NYS	2.0 km	MPC · JPL
68495	2001 UF_{21}	—	October 17, 2001	Socorro	LINEAR	GEF	3.4 km	MPC · JPL
68496	2001 UD_{33}	—	October 16, 2001	Socorro	LINEAR	·	6.2 km	MPC · JPL
68497	2001 UZ_{33}	—	October 16, 2001	Socorro	LINEAR	CYB	6.9 km	MPC · JPL
68498	2001 UV_{34}	—	October 16, 2001	Socorro	LINEAR	EOS	4.2 km	MPC · JPL
68499	2001 UM_{36}	—	October 16, 2001	Socorro	LINEAR	·	4.0 km	MPC · JPL
68500	2001 UP_{45}	—	October 17, 2001	Socorro	LINEAR	·	4.4 km	MPC · JPL

== 68501–68600 ==
back to top

Designation			Discovery			Properties		Ref
Permanent	Provisional	Named after	Date	Site	Discoverer(s)	Category	Diam.	Ref
68501	2001 UE_{53}	—	October 17, 2001	Socorro	LINEAR	PHO	1.7 km	MPC · JPL
68502	2001 US_{66}	—	October 19, 2001	Socorro	LINEAR	·	1.9 km	MPC · JPL
68503	2001 UC_{118}	—	October 22, 2001	Socorro	LINEAR	·	4.3 km	MPC · JPL
68504	2001 UK_{119}	—	October 22, 2001	Socorro	LINEAR	·	2.6 km	MPC · JPL
68505	2001 UM_{120}	—	October 22, 2001	Socorro	LINEAR	·	1.4 km	MPC · JPL
68506	2001 UW_{121}	—	October 22, 2001	Socorro	LINEAR	NYS	2.5 km	MPC · JPL
68507	2001 US_{122}	—	October 22, 2001	Socorro	LINEAR	·	7.8 km	MPC · JPL
68508	2001 UZ_{134}	—	October 21, 2001	Socorro	LINEAR	·	3.2 km	MPC · JPL
68509	2001 UA_{135}	—	October 21, 2001	Socorro	LINEAR	·	2.7 km	MPC · JPL
68510	2001 UX_{154}	—	October 23, 2001	Socorro	LINEAR	·	2.0 km	MPC · JPL
68511	2001 UH_{161}	—	October 23, 2001	Socorro	LINEAR	·	1.7 km	MPC · JPL
68512	2001 UV_{161}	—	October 23, 2001	Socorro	LINEAR	·	3.3 km	MPC · JPL
68513	2001 UL_{167}	—	October 19, 2001	Socorro	LINEAR	·	3.8 km	MPC · JPL
68514	2001 UV_{177}	—	October 21, 2001	Socorro	LINEAR	·	3.8 km	MPC · JPL
68515	2001 UZ_{183}	—	October 16, 2001	Socorro	LINEAR	·	4.3 km	MPC · JPL
68516	2001 UD_{188}	—	October 17, 2001	Socorro	LINEAR	·	2.9 km	MPC · JPL
68517	2001 UC_{214}	—	October 23, 2001	Anderson Mesa	LONEOS	·	6.7 km	MPC · JPL
68518	2001 VM_{14}	—	November 10, 2001	Socorro	LINEAR	·	3.5 km	MPC · JPL
68519	2001 VW_{15}	—	November 6, 2001	Palomar	NEAT	L5	28 km	MPC · JPL
68520	2001 VT_{19}	—	November 9, 2001	Socorro	LINEAR	·	5.0 km	MPC · JPL
68521	2001 VA_{25}	—	November 9, 2001	Socorro	LINEAR	KOR	2.5 km	MPC · JPL
68522	2001 VO_{28}	—	November 9, 2001	Socorro	LINEAR	(5)	2.3 km	MPC · JPL
68523	2001 VR_{28}	—	November 9, 2001	Socorro	LINEAR	·	2.0 km	MPC · JPL
68524	2001 VZ_{31}	—	November 9, 2001	Socorro	LINEAR	NYS	1.7 km	MPC · JPL
68525	2001 VE_{33}	—	November 9, 2001	Socorro	LINEAR	·	2.6 km	MPC · JPL
68526	2001 VC_{44}	—	November 9, 2001	Socorro	LINEAR	·	4.6 km	MPC · JPL
68527	2001 VO_{59}	—	November 10, 2001	Socorro	LINEAR	·	2.2 km	MPC · JPL
68528	2001 VC_{60}	—	November 10, 2001	Socorro	LINEAR	EOS	4.4 km	MPC · JPL
68529	2001 VP_{63}	—	November 10, 2001	Socorro	LINEAR	·	3.3 km	MPC · JPL
68530	2001 VQ_{69}	—	November 11, 2001	Socorro	LINEAR	·	2.9 km	MPC · JPL
68531	2001 VQ_{91}	—	November 15, 2001	Socorro	LINEAR	·	3.8 km	MPC · JPL
68532	2001 VU_{92}	—	November 15, 2001	Socorro	LINEAR	·	4.6 km	MPC · JPL
68533	2001 VT_{94}	—	November 15, 2001	Socorro	LINEAR	·	4.7 km	MPC · JPL
68534	2001 VT_{95}	—	November 15, 2001	Socorro	LINEAR	·	4.4 km	MPC · JPL
68535	2001 VP_{97}	—	November 15, 2001	Socorro	LINEAR	·	3.8 km	MPC · JPL
68536	2001 VU_{115}	—	November 12, 2001	Socorro	LINEAR	·	1.9 km	MPC · JPL
68537	2001 VC_{123}	—	November 11, 2001	Anderson Mesa	LONEOS	H	1.2 km	MPC · JPL
68538	2001 VN_{125}	—	November 11, 2001	Kitt Peak	Spacewatch	MRX	2.3 km	MPC · JPL
68539	2001 WL_{2}	—	November 17, 2001	Ondřejov	P. Kušnirák	·	1.7 km	MPC · JPL
68540	2001 WR_{9}	—	November 17, 2001	Socorro	LINEAR	TEL	3.5 km	MPC · JPL
68541	2001 WE_{40}	—	November 17, 2001	Socorro	LINEAR	·	1.9 km	MPC · JPL
68542	2001 WE_{99}	—	November 17, 2001	Jonathan B. Postel	Pozzoli, V.	·	2.3 km	MPC · JPL
68543	2001 WQ_{101}	—	November 17, 2001	Kitt Peak	Spacewatch	·	3.1 km	MPC · JPL
68544	2001 XO_{18}	—	December 9, 2001	Socorro	LINEAR	·	7.6 km	MPC · JPL
68545	2001 XQ_{23}	—	December 9, 2001	Socorro	LINEAR	EUN	3.8 km	MPC · JPL
68546	2001 XF_{26}	—	December 10, 2001	Socorro	LINEAR	·	4.7 km	MPC · JPL
68547	2001 XW_{29}	—	December 11, 2001	Socorro	LINEAR	H	1.6 km	MPC · JPL
68548	2001 XR_{31}	—	December 13, 2001	Socorro	LINEAR	APO +1km · PHA	1.2 km	MPC · JPL
68549	2001 XD_{52}	—	December 10, 2001	Socorro	LINEAR	·	1.9 km	MPC · JPL
68550	2001 XA_{54}	—	December 10, 2001	Socorro	LINEAR	NYS	1.5 km	MPC · JPL
68551	2001 XH_{57}	—	December 10, 2001	Socorro	LINEAR	EUN	4.0 km	MPC · JPL
68552	2001 XQ_{64}	—	December 10, 2001	Socorro	LINEAR	·	6.3 km	MPC · JPL
68553	2001 XF_{68}	—	December 10, 2001	Socorro	LINEAR	H	1.6 km	MPC · JPL
68554	2001 XY_{81}	—	December 11, 2001	Socorro	LINEAR	·	1.8 km	MPC · JPL
68555	2001 XX_{84}	—	December 11, 2001	Socorro	LINEAR	·	8.0 km	MPC · JPL
68556	2001 XW_{93}	—	December 10, 2001	Socorro	LINEAR	·	4.5 km	MPC · JPL
68557	2001 XF_{109}	—	December 10, 2001	Socorro	LINEAR	·	2.4 km	MPC · JPL
68558	2001 XX_{113}	—	December 11, 2001	Socorro	LINEAR	·	5.6 km	MPC · JPL
68559	2001 XT_{119}	—	December 13, 2001	Socorro	LINEAR	·	6.2 km	MPC · JPL
68560	2001 XB_{120}	—	December 13, 2001	Socorro	LINEAR	URS	11 km	MPC · JPL
68561	2001 XM_{156}	—	December 14, 2001	Socorro	LINEAR	·	3.2 km	MPC · JPL
68562	2001 XE_{195}	—	December 14, 2001	Socorro	LINEAR	·	3.2 km	MPC · JPL
68563	2001 XO_{206}	—	December 11, 2001	Socorro	LINEAR	·	3.7 km	MPC · JPL
68564	2001 XF_{213}	—	December 11, 2001	Socorro	LINEAR	·	3.1 km	MPC · JPL
68565	2001 XV_{239}	—	December 15, 2001	Socorro	LINEAR	·	5.2 km	MPC · JPL
68566	2001 XT_{243}	—	December 14, 2001	Socorro	LINEAR	·	1.7 km	MPC · JPL
68567	2001 XB_{248}	—	December 13, 2001	Palomar	NEAT	ERI	3.6 km	MPC · JPL
68568	2001 XV_{259}	—	December 9, 2001	Anderson Mesa	LONEOS	·	2.9 km	MPC · JPL
68569	2001 YE_{3}	—	December 19, 2001	Socorro	LINEAR	·	2.4 km	MPC · JPL
68570	2001 YQ_{4}	—	December 23, 2001	Kingsnake	J. V. McClusky	H	1.2 km	MPC · JPL
68571	2001 YR_{10}	—	December 17, 2001	Socorro	LINEAR	·	2.7 km	MPC · JPL
68572	2001 YQ_{19}	—	December 17, 2001	Socorro	LINEAR	·	3.7 km	MPC · JPL
68573	2001 YX_{24}	—	December 18, 2001	Socorro	LINEAR	·	2.2 km	MPC · JPL
68574	2001 YG_{27}	—	December 18, 2001	Socorro	LINEAR	·	2.5 km	MPC · JPL
68575	2001 YO_{43}	—	December 18, 2001	Socorro	LINEAR	V	2.0 km	MPC · JPL
68576	2001 YC_{53}	—	December 18, 2001	Socorro	LINEAR	·	2.4 km	MPC · JPL
68577	2001 YM_{59}	—	December 18, 2001	Socorro	LINEAR	·	2.6 km	MPC · JPL
68578	2001 YP_{75}	—	December 18, 2001	Socorro	LINEAR	PHO	2.2 km	MPC · JPL
68579	2001 YB_{83}	—	December 18, 2001	Socorro	LINEAR	·	6.9 km	MPC · JPL
68580	2001 YG_{91}	—	December 17, 2001	Palomar	NEAT	·	2.6 km	MPC · JPL
68581	2001 YG_{118}	—	December 18, 2001	Socorro	LINEAR	·	3.5 km	MPC · JPL
68582	2001 YS_{118}	—	December 18, 2001	Socorro	LINEAR	GEF	3.0 km	MPC · JPL
68583	2001 YD_{150}	—	December 19, 2001	Socorro	LINEAR	·	3.5 km	MPC · JPL
68584	2002 AT_{3}	—	January 8, 2002	Oizumi	T. Kobayashi	MAR	2.6 km	MPC · JPL
68585 Skorov	2002 AY_{6}	Skorov	January 9, 2002	Cima Ekar	ADAS	PHO	2.7 km	MPC · JPL
68586	2002 AC_{8}	—	January 5, 2002	Haleakala	NEAT	·	2.2 km	MPC · JPL
68587	2002 AD_{10}	—	January 11, 2002	Desert Eagle	W. K. Y. Yeung	(5)	2.4 km	MPC · JPL
68588	2002 AF_{10}	—	January 11, 2002	Desert Eagle	W. K. Y. Yeung	·	2.1 km	MPC · JPL
68589	2002 AG_{10}	—	January 11, 2002	Desert Eagle	W. K. Y. Yeung	·	4.4 km	MPC · JPL
68590	2002 AZ_{17}	—	January 12, 2002	Socorro	LINEAR	H	1.6 km	MPC · JPL
68591	2002 AO_{24}	—	January 8, 2002	Palomar	NEAT	EUN	2.7 km	MPC · JPL
68592	2002 AS_{27}	—	January 7, 2002	Anderson Mesa	LONEOS	·	4.1 km	MPC · JPL
68593	2002 AT_{28}	—	January 7, 2002	Anderson Mesa	LONEOS	H	1.2 km	MPC · JPL
68594	2002 AJ_{37}	—	January 9, 2002	Socorro	LINEAR	EUN	4.0 km	MPC · JPL
68595	2002 AN_{37}	—	January 9, 2002	Socorro	LINEAR	·	3.4 km	MPC · JPL
68596	2002 AW_{38}	—	January 9, 2002	Socorro	LINEAR	AGN	2.4 km	MPC · JPL
68597	2002 AX_{42}	—	January 9, 2002	Socorro	LINEAR	·	2.4 km	MPC · JPL
68598	2002 AY_{50}	—	January 9, 2002	Socorro	LINEAR	NYS	1.8 km	MPC · JPL
68599	2002 AU_{62}	—	January 11, 2002	Socorro	LINEAR	NYS	3.1 km	MPC · JPL
68600	2002 AS_{64}	—	January 11, 2002	Socorro	LINEAR	·	1.9 km	MPC · JPL

== 68601–68700 ==
back to top

Designation			Discovery			Properties		Ref
Permanent	Provisional	Named after	Date	Site	Discoverer(s)	Category	Diam.	Ref
68601	2002 AD_{66}	—	January 12, 2002	Socorro	LINEAR	·	3.6 km	MPC · JPL
68602	2002 AB_{82}	—	January 9, 2002	Socorro	LINEAR	·	3.0 km	MPC · JPL
68603	2002 AR_{86}	—	January 9, 2002	Socorro	LINEAR	·	4.5 km	MPC · JPL
68604	2002 AJ_{100}	—	January 8, 2002	Socorro	LINEAR	(2076)	2.5 km	MPC · JPL
68605	2002 AQ_{112}	—	January 9, 2002	Socorro	LINEAR	·	8.1 km	MPC · JPL
68606	2002 AT_{112}	—	January 9, 2002	Socorro	LINEAR	·	4.0 km	MPC · JPL
68607	2002 AP_{116}	—	January 9, 2002	Socorro	LINEAR	·	2.5 km	MPC · JPL
68608	2002 AM_{117}	—	January 9, 2002	Socorro	LINEAR	PHO	3.6 km	MPC · JPL
68609	2002 AT_{118}	—	January 9, 2002	Socorro	LINEAR	·	1.7 km	MPC · JPL
68610	2002 AD_{122}	—	January 9, 2002	Socorro	LINEAR	·	4.0 km	MPC · JPL
68611	2002 AG_{122}	—	January 9, 2002	Socorro	LINEAR	·	2.8 km	MPC · JPL
68612	2002 AM_{125}	—	January 11, 2002	Socorro	LINEAR	NYS	2.0 km	MPC · JPL
68613	2002 AH_{131}	—	January 12, 2002	Socorro	LINEAR	H	1.7 km	MPC · JPL
68614	2002 AL_{136}	—	January 9, 2002	Socorro	LINEAR	·	2.4 km	MPC · JPL
68615	2002 AC_{148}	—	January 13, 2002	Palomar	NEAT	·	4.4 km	MPC · JPL
68616	2002 AO_{152}	—	January 14, 2002	Socorro	LINEAR	NYS	1.9 km	MPC · JPL
68617	2002 AL_{159}	—	January 13, 2002	Socorro	LINEAR	MAS	1.8 km	MPC · JPL
68618	2002 AK_{164}	—	January 13, 2002	Socorro	LINEAR	·	1.3 km	MPC · JPL
68619	2002 AS_{166}	—	January 13, 2002	Socorro	LINEAR	·	1.7 km	MPC · JPL
68620	2002 AL_{178}	—	January 14, 2002	Socorro	LINEAR	(5)	2.7 km	MPC · JPL
68621	2002 AK_{189}	—	January 10, 2002	Palomar	NEAT	·	5.8 km	MPC · JPL
68622	2002 BQ	—	January 21, 2002	Desert Eagle	W. K. Y. Yeung	·	2.8 km	MPC · JPL
68623	2002 BL_{8}	—	January 18, 2002	Socorro	LINEAR	EUN	3.4 km	MPC · JPL
68624	2002 BS_{8}	—	January 18, 2002	Socorro	LINEAR	·	1.8 km	MPC · JPL
68625	2002 BW_{11}	—	January 19, 2002	Socorro	LINEAR	·	2.0 km	MPC · JPL
68626	2002 BK_{16}	—	January 19, 2002	Socorro	LINEAR	RAF	2.0 km	MPC · JPL
68627	2002 BF_{17}	—	January 19, 2002	Socorro	LINEAR	·	2.2 km	MPC · JPL
68628	2002 BU_{17}	—	January 21, 2002	Socorro	LINEAR	NYS	2.4 km	MPC · JPL
68629	2002 BZ_{17}	—	January 21, 2002	Socorro	LINEAR	·	4.2 km	MPC · JPL
68630	2002 BU_{25}	—	January 25, 2002	Palomar	NEAT	·	5.5 km	MPC · JPL
68631	2002 BW_{28}	—	January 19, 2002	Anderson Mesa	LONEOS	·	8.3 km	MPC · JPL
68632	2002 CN_{7}	—	February 6, 2002	Fountain Hills	C. W. Juels, P. R. Holvorcem	H	1.1 km	MPC · JPL
68633	2002 CY_{13}	—	February 8, 2002	Desert Eagle	W. K. Y. Yeung	NYS ·	3.8 km	MPC · JPL
68634	2002 CY_{14}	—	February 9, 2002	Desert Eagle	W. K. Y. Yeung	NYS	1.5 km	MPC · JPL
68635	2002 CT_{15}	—	February 8, 2002	Fountain Hills	C. W. Juels, P. R. Holvorcem	·	2.0 km	MPC · JPL
68636	2002 CR_{17}	—	February 6, 2002	Socorro	LINEAR	·	4.6 km	MPC · JPL
68637	2002 CU_{26}	—	February 6, 2002	Socorro	LINEAR	PHO	3.4 km	MPC · JPL
68638	2002 CO_{30}	—	February 6, 2002	Socorro	LINEAR	·	3.6 km	MPC · JPL
68639	2002 CV_{31}	—	February 6, 2002	Socorro	LINEAR	·	2.0 km	MPC · JPL
68640	2002 CX_{38}	—	February 7, 2002	Socorro	LINEAR	BRU	5.0 km	MPC · JPL
68641	2002 CR_{43}	—	February 8, 2002	Socorro	LINEAR	·	2.0 km	MPC · JPL
68642	2002 CH_{45}	—	February 8, 2002	Kitt Peak	Spacewatch	·	2.4 km	MPC · JPL
68643	2002 CZ_{49}	—	February 3, 2002	Haleakala	NEAT	·	4.4 km	MPC · JPL
68644	2002 CX_{50}	—	February 12, 2002	Desert Eagle	W. K. Y. Yeung	·	1.6 km	MPC · JPL
68645	2002 CQ_{52}	—	February 11, 2002	Fountain Hills	C. W. Juels, P. R. Holvorcem	PHO	5.6 km	MPC · JPL
68646	2002 CN_{53}	—	February 7, 2002	Socorro	LINEAR	NYS	3.3 km	MPC · JPL
68647	2002 CG_{54}	—	February 7, 2002	Socorro	LINEAR	·	1.9 km	MPC · JPL
68648	2002 CT_{55}	—	February 7, 2002	Socorro	LINEAR	·	2.6 km	MPC · JPL
68649	2002 CT_{57}	—	February 7, 2002	Socorro	LINEAR	·	2.5 km	MPC · JPL
68650	2002 CP_{59}	—	February 13, 2002	Desert Eagle	W. K. Y. Yeung	·	2.3 km	MPC · JPL
68651	2002 CS_{60}	—	February 6, 2002	Socorro	LINEAR	·	4.5 km	MPC · JPL
68652	2002 CU_{74}	—	February 7, 2002	Socorro	LINEAR	·	3.4 km	MPC · JPL
68653	2002 CL_{78}	—	February 7, 2002	Socorro	LINEAR	NYS	2.2 km	MPC · JPL
68654	2002 CR_{78}	—	February 7, 2002	Socorro	LINEAR	·	2.1 km	MPC · JPL
68655	2002 CS_{78}	—	February 7, 2002	Socorro	LINEAR	·	1.4 km	MPC · JPL
68656	2002 CU_{78}	—	February 7, 2002	Socorro	LINEAR	·	1.8 km	MPC · JPL
68657	2002 CW_{87}	—	February 7, 2002	Socorro	LINEAR	NYS	2.2 km	MPC · JPL
68658	2002 CN_{89}	—	February 7, 2002	Socorro	LINEAR	NYS	2.2 km	MPC · JPL
68659	2002 CH_{91}	—	February 7, 2002	Socorro	LINEAR	NYS ·	3.5 km	MPC · JPL
68660	2002 CZ_{91}	—	February 7, 2002	Socorro	LINEAR	V	1.2 km	MPC · JPL
68661	2002 CR_{93}	—	February 7, 2002	Socorro	LINEAR	·	1.8 km	MPC · JPL
68662	2002 CP_{94}	—	February 7, 2002	Socorro	LINEAR	·	3.9 km	MPC · JPL
68663	2002 CM_{99}	—	February 7, 2002	Socorro	LINEAR	MAS	1.9 km	MPC · JPL
68664	2002 CN_{100}	—	February 7, 2002	Socorro	LINEAR	·	2.3 km	MPC · JPL
68665	2002 CM_{101}	—	February 7, 2002	Socorro	LINEAR	·	4.9 km	MPC · JPL
68666	2002 CN_{104}	—	February 7, 2002	Socorro	LINEAR	PHO · slow	3.1 km	MPC · JPL
68667	2002 CJ_{107}	—	February 7, 2002	Socorro	LINEAR	NYS	2.2 km	MPC · JPL
68668	2002 CA_{109}	—	February 7, 2002	Socorro	LINEAR	·	2.3 km	MPC · JPL
68669	2002 CJ_{109}	—	February 7, 2002	Socorro	LINEAR	·	2.2 km	MPC · JPL
68670	2002 CV_{110}	—	February 7, 2002	Socorro	LINEAR	·	3.6 km	MPC · JPL
68671	2002 CC_{112}	—	February 7, 2002	Socorro	LINEAR	GEF	3.8 km	MPC · JPL
68672	2002 CS_{114}	—	February 8, 2002	Socorro	LINEAR	·	7.1 km	MPC · JPL
68673	2002 CD_{115}	—	February 9, 2002	Socorro	LINEAR	NYS ·	3.1 km	MPC · JPL
68674	2002 CV_{117}	—	February 12, 2002	Desert Eagle	W. K. Y. Yeung	·	1.6 km	MPC · JPL
68675	2002 CV_{123}	—	February 7, 2002	Socorro	LINEAR	·	1.4 km	MPC · JPL
68676	2002 CZ_{125}	—	February 7, 2002	Socorro	LINEAR	NYS ·	4.3 km	MPC · JPL
68677	2002 CW_{133}	—	February 7, 2002	Socorro	LINEAR	·	4.5 km	MPC · JPL
68678	2002 CL_{134}	—	February 7, 2002	Socorro	LINEAR	·	2.5 km	MPC · JPL
68679	2002 CP_{134}	—	February 7, 2002	Socorro	LINEAR	·	8.1 km	MPC · JPL
68680	2002 CV_{134}	—	February 7, 2002	Socorro	LINEAR	·	7.8 km	MPC · JPL
68681	2002 CE_{138}	—	February 8, 2002	Socorro	LINEAR	V	1.2 km	MPC · JPL
68682	2002 CR_{140}	—	February 8, 2002	Socorro	LINEAR	·	3.4 km	MPC · JPL
68683	2002 CX_{141}	—	February 8, 2002	Socorro	LINEAR	·	2.2 km	MPC · JPL
68684	2002 CC_{142}	—	February 8, 2002	Socorro	LINEAR	PHO	3.1 km	MPC · JPL
68685	2002 CK_{142}	—	February 8, 2002	Socorro	LINEAR	·	4.7 km	MPC · JPL
68686	2002 CL_{145}	—	February 9, 2002	Socorro	LINEAR	·	2.0 km	MPC · JPL
68687	2002 CV_{145}	—	February 9, 2002	Socorro	LINEAR	·	2.7 km	MPC · JPL
68688	2002 CX_{145}	—	February 9, 2002	Socorro	LINEAR	NYS	2.4 km	MPC · JPL
68689	2002 CZ_{150}	—	February 10, 2002	Socorro	LINEAR	V	1.3 km	MPC · JPL
68690	2002 CD_{164}	—	February 8, 2002	Socorro	LINEAR	BRA	2.6 km	MPC · JPL
68691	2002 CO_{165}	—	February 8, 2002	Socorro	LINEAR	·	3.4 km	MPC · JPL
68692	2002 CV_{167}	—	February 8, 2002	Socorro	LINEAR	·	3.7 km	MPC · JPL
68693	2002 CX_{168}	—	February 8, 2002	Socorro	LINEAR	·	2.7 km	MPC · JPL
68694	2002 CG_{169}	—	February 8, 2002	Socorro	LINEAR	·	3.5 km	MPC · JPL
68695	2002 CB_{171}	—	February 8, 2002	Socorro	LINEAR	·	2.3 km	MPC · JPL
68696	2002 CX_{173}	—	February 8, 2002	Socorro	LINEAR	·	11 km	MPC · JPL
68697	2002 CR_{176}	—	February 10, 2002	Socorro	LINEAR	·	1.5 km	MPC · JPL
68698	2002 CG_{183}	—	February 10, 2002	Socorro	LINEAR	·	5.2 km	MPC · JPL
68699	2002 CY_{192}	—	February 10, 2002	Socorro	LINEAR	·	2.9 km	MPC · JPL
68700	2002 CN_{198}	—	February 10, 2002	Socorro	LINEAR	·	2.6 km	MPC · JPL

== 68701–68800 ==
back to top

Designation			Discovery			Properties		Ref
Permanent	Provisional	Named after	Date	Site	Discoverer(s)	Category	Diam.	Ref
68701	2002 CJ_{200}	—	February 10, 2002	Socorro	LINEAR	NYS	2.1 km	MPC · JPL
68702	2002 CU_{215}	—	February 10, 2002	Socorro	LINEAR	NYS ·	3.6 km	MPC · JPL
68703	2002 CO_{219}	—	February 10, 2002	Socorro	LINEAR	V	1.3 km	MPC · JPL
68704	2002 CY_{219}	—	February 10, 2002	Socorro	LINEAR	·	2.2 km	MPC · JPL
68705	2002 CM_{221}	—	February 10, 2002	Socorro	LINEAR	V	1.6 km	MPC · JPL
68706	2002 CX_{234}	—	February 8, 2002	Kitt Peak	Spacewatch	CYB · slow	7.9 km	MPC · JPL
68707	2002 CX_{235}	—	February 13, 2002	Socorro	LINEAR	PHO	3.5 km	MPC · JPL
68708	2002 CC_{242}	—	February 11, 2002	Socorro	LINEAR	·	2.5 km	MPC · JPL
68709	2002 CE_{244}	—	February 11, 2002	Socorro	LINEAR	·	2.7 km	MPC · JPL
68710	2002 CN_{244}	—	February 11, 2002	Socorro	LINEAR	·	3.7 km	MPC · JPL
68711	2002 CV_{244}	—	February 11, 2002	Socorro	LINEAR	·	2.6 km	MPC · JPL
68712	2002 CO_{249}	—	February 15, 2002	Socorro	LINEAR	·	1.8 km	MPC · JPL
68713	2002 CX_{253}	—	February 4, 2002	Palomar	NEAT	·	4.3 km	MPC · JPL
68714	2002 CS_{259}	—	February 6, 2002	Haleakala	NEAT	PHO	1.9 km	MPC · JPL
68715	2002 CM_{272}	—	February 8, 2002	Anderson Mesa	LONEOS	·	2.3 km	MPC · JPL
68716	2002 CX_{280}	—	February 8, 2002	Kitt Peak	M. W. Buie	NYS	1.7 km	MPC · JPL
68717	2002 CO_{286}	—	February 10, 2002	Socorro	LINEAR	·	2.1 km	MPC · JPL
68718 Safi	2002 DQ	Safi	February 17, 2002	Vicques	M. Ory	·	2.3 km	MPC · JPL
68719 Jangyeongsil	2002 DW	Jangyeongsil	February 16, 2002	Bohyunsan	Jeon, Y.-B.	·	4.2 km	MPC · JPL
68720	2002 DB_{3}	—	February 21, 2002	Nashville	Clingan, R.	DOR	5.2 km	MPC · JPL
68721	2002 DC_{6}	—	February 16, 2002	Haleakala	NEAT	·	5.8 km	MPC · JPL
68722	2002 DF_{6}	—	February 19, 2002	Kitt Peak	Spacewatch	·	3.5 km	MPC · JPL
68723	2002 DH_{10}	—	February 20, 2002	Socorro	LINEAR	·	3.9 km	MPC · JPL
68724	2002 DH_{12}	—	February 21, 2002	Palomar	NEAT	H	1.4 km	MPC · JPL
68725	2002 ED_{3}	—	March 10, 2002	Haleakala	NEAT	L4	18 km	MPC · JPL
68726	2002 EZ_{5}	—	March 12, 2002	Črni Vrh	Mikuž, H.	·	6.6 km	MPC · JPL
68727	2002 EH_{6}	—	March 12, 2002	Desert Eagle	W. K. Y. Yeung	NYS	2.0 km	MPC · JPL
68728	2002 EP_{6}	—	March 6, 2002	Siding Spring	R. H. McNaught	·	1.8 km	MPC · JPL
68729	2002 EG_{12}	—	March 14, 2002	Desert Eagle	W. K. Y. Yeung	·	2.1 km	MPC · JPL
68730 Straižys	2002 EA_{13}	Straižys	March 15, 2002	Moletai	K. Černis, Zdanavicius, J.	·	2.4 km	MPC · JPL
68731	2002 ES_{16}	—	March 6, 2002	Socorro	LINEAR	PHO · slow	3.1 km	MPC · JPL
68732	2002 EF_{21}	—	March 10, 2002	Haleakala	NEAT	·	2.3 km	MPC · JPL
68733	2002 EF_{25}	—	March 10, 2002	Anderson Mesa	LONEOS	·	7.7 km	MPC · JPL
68734	2002 EH_{26}	—	March 10, 2002	Anderson Mesa	LONEOS	V	1.4 km	MPC · JPL
68735	2002 ET_{26}	—	March 10, 2002	Anderson Mesa	LONEOS	·	7.8 km	MPC · JPL
68736	2002 EQ_{28}	—	March 9, 2002	Socorro	LINEAR	·	3.2 km	MPC · JPL
68737	2002 EU_{28}	—	March 9, 2002	Socorro	LINEAR	(2076)	2.0 km	MPC · JPL
68738	2002 EJ_{35}	—	March 11, 2002	Haleakala	NEAT	·	5.1 km	MPC · JPL
68739	2002 EK_{38}	—	March 12, 2002	Kitt Peak	Spacewatch	·	4.5 km	MPC · JPL
68740	2002 EY_{38}	—	March 12, 2002	Kitt Peak	Spacewatch	NYS ·	2.7 km	MPC · JPL
68741	2002 EM_{40}	—	March 9, 2002	Socorro	LINEAR	slow	8.0 km	MPC · JPL
68742	2002 EO_{41}	—	March 12, 2002	Socorro	LINEAR	·	3.9 km	MPC · JPL
68743	2002 EY_{42}	—	March 12, 2002	Socorro	LINEAR	·	2.1 km	MPC · JPL
68744	2002 EV_{43}	—	March 12, 2002	Socorro	LINEAR	·	4.1 km	MPC · JPL
68745	2002 EP_{45}	—	March 11, 2002	Palomar	NEAT	·	1.7 km	MPC · JPL
68746	2002 EM_{46}	—	March 11, 2002	Palomar	NEAT	·	1.8 km	MPC · JPL
68747	2002 EL_{49}	—	March 12, 2002	Palomar	NEAT	MAS	1.5 km	MPC · JPL
68748	2002 EE_{57}	—	March 13, 2002	Socorro	LINEAR	EUN	1.9 km	MPC · JPL
68749	2002 EJ_{63}	—	March 13, 2002	Socorro	LINEAR	NYS	2.6 km	MPC · JPL
68750	2002 EM_{68}	—	March 13, 2002	Socorro	LINEAR	·	2.2 km	MPC · JPL
68751	2002 ES_{69}	—	March 13, 2002	Socorro	LINEAR	INA	5.9 km	MPC · JPL
68752	2002 EF_{70}	—	March 13, 2002	Socorro	LINEAR	·	2.7 km	MPC · JPL
68753	2002 EY_{74}	—	March 13, 2002	Socorro	LINEAR	·	2.2 km	MPC · JPL
68754	2002 EM_{75}	—	March 14, 2002	Palomar	NEAT	·	2.4 km	MPC · JPL
68755	2002 EN_{79}	—	March 10, 2002	Haleakala	NEAT	·	3.1 km	MPC · JPL
68756	2002 EW_{83}	—	March 9, 2002	Socorro	LINEAR	NYS ·	4.2 km	MPC · JPL
68757	2002 EH_{86}	—	March 9, 2002	Socorro	LINEAR	·	4.9 km	MPC · JPL
68758	2002 EB_{87}	—	March 9, 2002	Socorro	LINEAR	NYS	2.7 km	MPC · JPL
68759	2002 EH_{87}	—	March 9, 2002	Socorro	LINEAR	·	3.6 km	MPC · JPL
68760	2002 EL_{87}	—	March 9, 2002	Socorro	LINEAR	·	2.7 km	MPC · JPL
68761	2002 ES_{89}	—	March 12, 2002	Socorro	LINEAR	·	1.8 km	MPC · JPL
68762	2002 EE_{94}	—	March 14, 2002	Socorro	LINEAR	TIR	6.7 km	MPC · JPL
68763	2002 ED_{96}	—	March 15, 2002	Socorro	LINEAR	·	4.1 km	MPC · JPL
68764	2002 EY_{98}	—	March 15, 2002	Socorro	LINEAR	·	3.0 km	MPC · JPL
68765	2002 EE_{99}	—	March 15, 2002	Socorro	LINEAR	(1338) (FLO)	2.2 km	MPC · JPL
68766	2002 EN_{102}	—	March 6, 2002	Palomar	NEAT	L4	18 km	MPC · JPL
68767	2002 ES_{104}	—	March 9, 2002	Palomar	NEAT	·	2.1 km	MPC · JPL
68768	2002 EC_{106}	—	March 9, 2002	Anderson Mesa	LONEOS	·	4.2 km	MPC · JPL
68769	2002 ER_{110}	—	March 9, 2002	Catalina	CSS	·	4.2 km	MPC · JPL
68770	2002 EJ_{131}	—	March 13, 2002	Kitt Peak	Spacewatch	MAS	1.4 km	MPC · JPL
68771	2002 EW_{138}	—	March 12, 2002	Palomar	NEAT	·	1.2 km	MPC · JPL
68772	2002 EB_{147}	—	March 14, 2002	Palomar	NEAT	·	2.7 km	MPC · JPL
68773	2002 EB_{153}	—	March 15, 2002	Palomar	NEAT	·	4.8 km	MPC · JPL
68774	2002 EG_{153}	—	March 15, 2002	Palomar	NEAT	EUN	3.0 km	MPC · JPL
68775	2002 EH_{154}	—	March 13, 2002	Socorro	LINEAR	·	4.0 km	MPC · JPL
68776	2002 EZ_{154}	—	March 11, 2002	Palomar	NEAT	·	2.3 km	MPC · JPL
68777	2002 FD_{1}	—	March 18, 2002	Desert Eagle	W. K. Y. Yeung	·	2.0 km	MPC · JPL
68778	2002 FO_{2}	—	March 19, 2002	Desert Eagle	W. K. Y. Yeung	·	3.8 km	MPC · JPL
68779 Schöninger	2002 FA_{3}	Schöninger	March 18, 2002	Kleť	KLENOT	·	3.4 km	MPC · JPL
68780	2002 FQ_{3}	—	March 18, 2002	Desert Eagle	W. K. Y. Yeung	·	2.5 km	MPC · JPL
68781	2002 FN_{7}	—	March 28, 2002	Haleakala	NEAT	·	4.7 km	MPC · JPL
68782	2002 FW_{7}	—	March 16, 2002	Socorro	LINEAR	V	1.9 km	MPC · JPL
68783	2002 FZ_{9}	—	March 16, 2002	Socorro	LINEAR	·	2.8 km	MPC · JPL
68784	2002 FK_{10}	—	March 17, 2002	Socorro	LINEAR	·	2.7 km	MPC · JPL
68785	2002 FS_{11}	—	March 16, 2002	Haleakala	NEAT	·	5.7 km	MPC · JPL
68786	2002 FA_{13}	—	March 16, 2002	Socorro	LINEAR	·	6.0 km	MPC · JPL
68787	2002 FJ_{13}	—	March 16, 2002	Socorro	LINEAR	V	2.0 km	MPC · JPL
68788	2002 FU_{13}	—	March 16, 2002	Haleakala	NEAT	L4	20 km	MPC · JPL
68789	2002 FD_{17}	—	March 17, 2002	Kitt Peak	Spacewatch	·	5.4 km	MPC · JPL
68790	2002 FL_{28}	—	March 20, 2002	Palomar	NEAT	·	4.2 km	MPC · JPL
68791	2002 FR_{30}	—	March 20, 2002	Palomar	NEAT	·	6.6 km	MPC · JPL
68792	2002 FY_{30}	—	March 20, 2002	Socorro	LINEAR	·	3.2 km	MPC · JPL
68793	2002 GR_{4}	—	April 10, 2002	Socorro	LINEAR	·	2.4 km	MPC · JPL
68794	2002 GZ_{6}	—	April 12, 2002	Desert Eagle	W. K. Y. Yeung	·	3.2 km	MPC · JPL
68795	2002 GE_{9}	—	April 15, 2002	Desert Eagle	W. K. Y. Yeung	·	2.1 km	MPC · JPL
68796	2002 GF_{9}	—	April 15, 2002	Desert Eagle	W. K. Y. Yeung	·	7.0 km	MPC · JPL
68797	2002 GG_{10}	—	April 4, 2002	Bergisch Gladbach	W. Bickel	·	3.2 km	MPC · JPL
68798	2002 GX_{15}	—	April 15, 2002	Socorro	LINEAR	·	2.4 km	MPC · JPL
68799	2002 GZ_{16}	—	April 15, 2002	Socorro	LINEAR	·	5.6 km	MPC · JPL
68800	2002 GY_{18}	—	April 14, 2002	Socorro	LINEAR	·	2.3 km	MPC · JPL

== 68801–68900 ==
back to top

Designation			Discovery			Properties		Ref
Permanent	Provisional	Named after	Date	Site	Discoverer(s)	Category	Diam.	Ref
68801	2002 GR_{20}	—	April 14, 2002	Socorro	LINEAR	·	1.9 km	MPC · JPL
68802	2002 GK_{21}	—	April 14, 2002	Socorro	LINEAR	THM	6.2 km	MPC · JPL
68803	2002 GT_{25}	—	April 14, 2002	Socorro	LINEAR	·	5.2 km	MPC · JPL
68804	2002 GG_{26}	—	April 14, 2002	Socorro	LINEAR	·	2.3 km	MPC · JPL
68805	2002 GW_{38}	—	April 2, 2002	Kitt Peak	Spacewatch	·	4.7 km	MPC · JPL
68806	2002 GR_{40}	—	April 4, 2002	Palomar	NEAT	·	1.6 km	MPC · JPL
68807	2002 GJ_{43}	—	April 4, 2002	Palomar	NEAT	·	1.6 km	MPC · JPL
68808	2002 GR_{50}	—	April 5, 2002	Palomar	NEAT	EUN	2.7 km	MPC · JPL
68809	2002 GB_{54}	—	April 5, 2002	Palomar	NEAT	·	5.7 km	MPC · JPL
68810	2002 GO_{54}	—	April 5, 2002	Palomar	NEAT	·	2.9 km	MPC · JPL
68811	2002 GD_{55}	—	April 5, 2002	Palomar	NEAT	V	1.8 km	MPC · JPL
68812	2002 GB_{56}	—	April 5, 2002	Anderson Mesa	LONEOS	·	6.5 km	MPC · JPL
68813	2002 GR_{64}	—	April 8, 2002	Palomar	NEAT	·	3.8 km	MPC · JPL
68814	2002 GP_{66}	—	April 8, 2002	Palomar	NEAT	·	3.2 km	MPC · JPL
68815	2002 GB_{67}	—	April 8, 2002	Kitt Peak	Spacewatch	·	2.2 km	MPC · JPL
68816	2002 GF_{67}	—	April 8, 2002	Kitt Peak	Spacewatch	·	2.6 km	MPC · JPL
68817	2002 GV_{70}	—	April 8, 2002	Palomar	NEAT	EUN	2.7 km	MPC · JPL
68818	2002 GH_{71}	—	April 9, 2002	Anderson Mesa	LONEOS	·	4.3 km	MPC · JPL
68819	2002 GO_{71}	—	April 9, 2002	Anderson Mesa	LONEOS	·	2.3 km	MPC · JPL
68820	2002 GB_{72}	—	April 9, 2002	Anderson Mesa	LONEOS	·	3.4 km	MPC · JPL
68821	2002 GM_{73}	—	April 9, 2002	Anderson Mesa	LONEOS	·	5.9 km	MPC · JPL
68822	2002 GD_{76}	—	April 9, 2002	Kitt Peak	Spacewatch	·	3.1 km	MPC · JPL
68823	2002 GZ_{80}	—	April 10, 2002	Socorro	LINEAR	·	2.4 km	MPC · JPL
68824	2002 GB_{81}	—	April 10, 2002	Socorro	LINEAR	V	1.7 km	MPC · JPL
68825	2002 GH_{81}	—	April 10, 2002	Socorro	LINEAR	·	1.8 km	MPC · JPL
68826	2002 GP_{82}	—	April 10, 2002	Socorro	LINEAR	·	3.7 km	MPC · JPL
68827	2002 GB_{85}	—	April 10, 2002	Socorro	LINEAR	EUN	2.5 km	MPC · JPL
68828	2002 GA_{86}	—	April 10, 2002	Socorro	LINEAR	(16286)	3.7 km	MPC · JPL
68829	2002 GE_{88}	—	April 10, 2002	Socorro	LINEAR	·	5.0 km	MPC · JPL
68830	2002 GF_{88}	—	April 10, 2002	Socorro	LINEAR	·	4.0 km	MPC · JPL
68831	2002 GG_{89}	—	April 10, 2002	Palomar	NEAT	·	3.7 km	MPC · JPL
68832	2002 GW_{91}	—	April 9, 2002	Socorro	LINEAR	·	4.1 km	MPC · JPL
68833	2002 GL_{98}	—	April 10, 2002	Socorro	LINEAR	·	3.3 km	MPC · JPL
68834	2002 GU_{104}	—	April 10, 2002	Socorro	LINEAR	EOS	5.2 km	MPC · JPL
68835	2002 GC_{105}	—	April 11, 2002	Anderson Mesa	LONEOS	·	5.7 km	MPC · JPL
68836	2002 GU_{105}	—	April 11, 2002	Anderson Mesa	LONEOS	PHO	4.4 km	MPC · JPL
68837	2002 GO_{109}	—	April 11, 2002	Palomar	NEAT	·	3.5 km	MPC · JPL
68838	2002 GL_{115}	—	April 11, 2002	Socorro	LINEAR	·	1.9 km	MPC · JPL
68839	2002 GJ_{116}	—	April 11, 2002	Socorro	LINEAR	·	3.3 km	MPC · JPL
68840	2002 GB_{118}	—	April 11, 2002	Socorro	LINEAR	·	2.3 km	MPC · JPL
68841	2002 GJ_{118}	—	April 12, 2002	Palomar	NEAT	·	3.9 km	MPC · JPL
68842	2002 GM_{122}	—	April 10, 2002	Socorro	LINEAR	V	1.5 km	MPC · JPL
68843	2002 GJ_{127}	—	April 12, 2002	Socorro	LINEAR	·	1.9 km	MPC · JPL
68844	2002 GL_{132}	—	April 12, 2002	Socorro	LINEAR	·	2.2 km	MPC · JPL
68845	2002 GU_{137}	—	April 12, 2002	Socorro	LINEAR	·	4.2 km	MPC · JPL
68846	2002 GV_{144}	—	April 12, 2002	Palomar	NEAT	NYS	3.0 km	MPC · JPL
68847	2002 GK_{155}	—	April 13, 2002	Palomar	NEAT	V	1.8 km	MPC · JPL
68848	2002 GU_{158}	—	April 13, 2002	Palomar	NEAT	PHO	2.3 km	MPC · JPL
68849	2002 GH_{161}	—	April 15, 2002	Anderson Mesa	LONEOS	EOS	4.1 km	MPC · JPL
68850	2002 GK_{165}	—	April 14, 2002	Palomar	NEAT	·	2.4 km	MPC · JPL
68851	2002 HV	—	April 16, 2002	Desert Eagle	W. K. Y. Yeung	·	6.1 km	MPC · JPL
68852	2002 HO_{3}	—	April 16, 2002	Socorro	LINEAR	GEF	2.8 km	MPC · JPL
68853 Vaimaca	2002 HA_{9}	Vaimaca	April 19, 2002	Los Molinos	Los Molinos	·	5.7 km	MPC · JPL
68854	2002 HS_{9}	—	April 17, 2002	Socorro	LINEAR	·	5.9 km	MPC · JPL
68855	2002 HS_{12}	—	April 29, 2002	Palomar	NEAT	·	2.6 km	MPC · JPL
68856	2002 HL_{15}	—	April 17, 2002	Socorro	LINEAR	·	4.4 km	MPC · JPL
68857	2002 JF	—	May 3, 2002	Desert Eagle	W. K. Y. Yeung	·	2.3 km	MPC · JPL
68858	2002 JW	—	May 3, 2002	Desert Eagle	W. K. Y. Yeung	EOS	4.4 km	MPC · JPL
68859	2002 JZ	—	May 3, 2002	Desert Eagle	W. K. Y. Yeung	·	5.7 km	MPC · JPL
68860	2002 JF_{2}	—	May 4, 2002	Palomar	NEAT	EUN	3.1 km	MPC · JPL
68861	2002 JQ_{3}	—	May 3, 2002	Anderson Mesa	LONEOS	URS	7.6 km	MPC · JPL
68862	2002 JU_{5}	—	May 5, 2002	Palomar	NEAT	·	3.0 km	MPC · JPL
68863	2002 JS_{6}	—	May 6, 2002	Kitt Peak	Spacewatch	·	6.7 km	MPC · JPL
68864	2002 JW_{9}	—	May 6, 2002	Socorro	LINEAR	·	6.8 km	MPC · JPL
68865	2002 JR_{14}	—	May 8, 2002	Socorro	LINEAR	·	3.4 km	MPC · JPL
68866	2002 JG_{15}	—	May 8, 2002	Socorro	LINEAR	·	6.2 km	MPC · JPL
68867	2002 JE_{16}	—	May 7, 2002	Palomar	NEAT	HNS	4.6 km	MPC · JPL
68868	2002 JY_{22}	—	May 8, 2002	Socorro	LINEAR	·	5.2 km	MPC · JPL
68869	2002 JL_{25}	—	May 8, 2002	Socorro	LINEAR	·	3.2 km	MPC · JPL
68870	2002 JU_{26}	—	May 8, 2002	Socorro	LINEAR	·	4.8 km	MPC · JPL
68871	2002 JC_{35}	—	May 9, 2002	Socorro	LINEAR	·	2.4 km	MPC · JPL
68872	2002 JP_{36}	—	May 4, 2002	Anderson Mesa	LONEOS	slow	3.7 km	MPC · JPL
68873	2002 JC_{37}	—	May 9, 2002	Anderson Mesa	LONEOS	·	3.4 km	MPC · JPL
68874	2002 JZ_{37}	—	May 8, 2002	Haleakala	NEAT	·	5.1 km	MPC · JPL
68875	2002 JT_{40}	—	May 8, 2002	Socorro	LINEAR	·	3.8 km	MPC · JPL
68876	2002 JR_{41}	—	May 8, 2002	Socorro	LINEAR	·	3.8 km	MPC · JPL
68877	2002 JW_{42}	—	May 8, 2002	Socorro	LINEAR	·	6.3 km	MPC · JPL
68878	2002 JN_{46}	—	May 9, 2002	Socorro	LINEAR	·	6.2 km	MPC · JPL
68879	2002 JB_{47}	—	May 9, 2002	Socorro	LINEAR	V	2.0 km	MPC · JPL
68880	2002 JM_{49}	—	May 9, 2002	Socorro	LINEAR	·	6.7 km	MPC · JPL
68881	2002 JH_{54}	—	May 9, 2002	Socorro	LINEAR	·	5.2 km	MPC · JPL
68882	2002 JM_{60}	—	May 10, 2002	Socorro	LINEAR	·	5.4 km	MPC · JPL
68883	2002 JQ_{60}	—	May 10, 2002	Palomar	NEAT	·	5.0 km	MPC · JPL
68884	2002 JZ_{62}	—	May 8, 2002	Socorro	LINEAR	·	4.4 km	MPC · JPL
68885	2002 JY_{70}	—	May 8, 2002	Socorro	LINEAR	V	1.6 km	MPC · JPL
68886	2002 JX_{71}	—	May 8, 2002	Socorro	LINEAR	·	5.8 km	MPC · JPL
68887	2002 JP_{72}	—	May 8, 2002	Socorro	LINEAR	·	6.0 km	MPC · JPL
68888	2002 JM_{73}	—	May 8, 2002	Socorro	LINEAR	·	8.2 km	MPC · JPL
68889	2002 JT_{73}	—	May 8, 2002	Socorro	LINEAR	·	8.3 km	MPC · JPL
68890	2002 JF_{76}	—	May 11, 2002	Socorro	LINEAR	MAR	1.8 km	MPC · JPL
68891	2002 JS_{79}	—	May 11, 2002	Socorro	LINEAR	·	4.8 km	MPC · JPL
68892	2002 JV_{81}	—	May 11, 2002	Socorro	LINEAR	·	4.7 km	MPC · JPL
68893	2002 JE_{84}	—	May 11, 2002	Socorro	LINEAR	KOR	3.0 km	MPC · JPL
68894	2002 JH_{84}	—	May 11, 2002	Socorro	LINEAR	·	2.3 km	MPC · JPL
68895	2002 JR_{84}	—	May 11, 2002	Socorro	LINEAR	V	1.8 km	MPC · JPL
68896	2002 JN_{85}	—	May 11, 2002	Socorro	LINEAR	EOS	5.0 km	MPC · JPL
68897	2002 JV_{85}	—	May 11, 2002	Socorro	LINEAR	DOR	6.5 km	MPC · JPL
68898	2002 JV_{89}	—	May 11, 2002	Socorro	LINEAR	NYS ·	4.3 km	MPC · JPL
68899	2002 JL_{95}	—	May 11, 2002	Socorro	LINEAR	THM	4.7 km	MPC · JPL
68900	2002 JC_{98}	—	May 8, 2002	Socorro	LINEAR	CYB	10 km	MPC · JPL

== 68901–69000 ==
back to top

Designation			Discovery			Properties		Ref
Permanent	Provisional	Named after	Date	Site	Discoverer(s)	Category	Diam.	Ref
68901	2002 JO_{100}	—	May 15, 2002	Fountain Hills	Hills, Fountain	EUN	2.3 km	MPC · JPL
68902	2002 JD_{101}	—	May 6, 2002	Socorro	LINEAR	HNS	2.8 km	MPC · JPL
68903	2002 JG_{101}	—	May 6, 2002	Socorro	LINEAR	·	6.5 km	MPC · JPL
68904	2002 JU_{103}	—	May 10, 2002	Socorro	LINEAR	·	6.2 km	MPC · JPL
68905	2002 JZ_{104}	—	May 12, 2002	Socorro	LINEAR	·	1.9 km	MPC · JPL
68906	2002 JO_{107}	—	May 13, 2002	Palomar	NEAT	·	3.9 km	MPC · JPL
68907	2002 JV_{110}	—	May 11, 2002	Socorro	LINEAR	EOS	4.9 km	MPC · JPL
68908	2002 JW_{117}	—	May 4, 2002	Anderson Mesa	LONEOS	EOS ·	4.7 km	MPC · JPL
68909	2002 JN_{119}	—	May 5, 2002	Palomar	NEAT	EUN	2.5 km	MPC · JPL
68910	2002 JB_{120}	—	May 5, 2002	Palomar	NEAT	·	4.6 km	MPC · JPL
68911	2002 JS_{120}	—	May 5, 2002	Palomar	NEAT	·	6.1 km	MPC · JPL
68912	2002 JE_{122}	—	May 6, 2002	Anderson Mesa	LONEOS	BRA	4.2 km	MPC · JPL
68913	2002 JB_{129}	—	May 8, 2002	Anderson Mesa	LONEOS	·	2.8 km	MPC · JPL
68914	2002 JR_{132}	—	May 9, 2002	Palomar	NEAT	·	2.5 km	MPC · JPL
68915	2002 KQ_{8}	—	May 30, 2002	Palomar	NEAT	EOS	4.1 km	MPC · JPL
68916	2002 KV_{9}	—	May 16, 2002	Socorro	LINEAR	·	5.0 km	MPC · JPL
68917	2002 KW_{9}	—	May 16, 2002	Socorro	LINEAR	·	4.1 km	MPC · JPL
68918	2002 KZ_{9}	—	May 16, 2002	Socorro	LINEAR	V	1.8 km	MPC · JPL
68919	2002 LL_{3}	—	June 3, 2002	Socorro	LINEAR	·	9.1 km	MPC · JPL
68920	2002 LT_{3}	—	June 3, 2002	Socorro	LINEAR	·	4.0 km	MPC · JPL
68921	2002 LQ_{6}	—	June 1, 2002	Palomar	NEAT	·	6.9 km	MPC · JPL
68922	2002 LW_{12}	—	June 5, 2002	Socorro	LINEAR	CYB	10 km	MPC · JPL
68923	2002 LV_{40}	—	June 10, 2002	Socorro	LINEAR	TIR	7.1 km	MPC · JPL
68924	2002 LT_{47}	—	June 12, 2002	Socorro	LINEAR	·	5.8 km	MPC · JPL
68925	2002 LP_{49}	—	June 8, 2002	Socorro	LINEAR	MAR	2.2 km	MPC · JPL
68926	2002 ME_{3}	—	June 19, 2002	Kitt Peak	Spacewatch	·	7.1 km	MPC · JPL
68927	2002 NB_{28}	—	July 13, 2002	Socorro	LINEAR	EOS	6.1 km	MPC · JPL
68928	2002 NG_{33}	—	July 13, 2002	Socorro	LINEAR	EOS	5.5 km	MPC · JPL
68929	2002 OB_{4}	—	July 17, 2002	Socorro	LINEAR	·	3.4 km	MPC · JPL
68930	2002 OD_{4}	—	July 17, 2002	Socorro	LINEAR	·	3.1 km	MPC · JPL
68931	2002 OJ_{8}	—	July 18, 2002	Palomar	NEAT	·	3.0 km	MPC · JPL
68932	2002 OB_{13}	—	July 18, 2002	Socorro	LINEAR	·	6.4 km	MPC · JPL
68933	2002 OM_{20}	—	July 28, 2002	Haleakala	NEAT	T_{j} (2.99) · 3:2	12 km	MPC · JPL
68934	2002 PA_{15}	—	August 6, 2002	Palomar	NEAT	·	7.0 km	MPC · JPL
68935	2002 PE_{32}	—	August 6, 2002	Palomar	NEAT	·	3.9 km	MPC · JPL
68936	2002 PM_{46}	—	August 9, 2002	Socorro	LINEAR	ADE	5.3 km	MPC · JPL
68937	2002 PQ_{49}	—	August 10, 2002	Socorro	LINEAR	·	5.7 km	MPC · JPL
68938	2002 PU_{49}	—	August 10, 2002	Socorro	LINEAR	NYS	2.5 km	MPC · JPL
68939	2002 PM_{102}	—	August 12, 2002	Socorro	LINEAR	·	6.8 km	MPC · JPL
68940	2002 PB_{116}	—	August 13, 2002	Socorro	LINEAR	·	8.8 km	MPC · JPL
68941	2002 PX_{124}	—	August 13, 2002	Anderson Mesa	LONEOS	·	3.4 km	MPC · JPL
68942	2002 PY_{125}	—	August 14, 2002	Socorro	LINEAR	KOR	3.2 km	MPC · JPL
68943	2002 PZ_{126}	—	August 14, 2002	Socorro	LINEAR	PHO	2.3 km	MPC · JPL
68944	2002 PQ_{130}	—	August 15, 2002	Socorro	LINEAR	·	7.1 km	MPC · JPL
68945	2002 PF_{132}	—	August 14, 2002	Socorro	LINEAR	HYG	7.4 km	MPC · JPL
68946	2002 PX_{138}	—	August 11, 2002	Haleakala	NEAT	·	3.9 km	MPC · JPL
68947 Brunofunk	2002 PW_{156}	Brunofunk	August 8, 2002	Palomar	S. F. Hönig	AGN	2.1 km	MPC · JPL
68948 Mikeoates	2002 PX_{157}	Mikeoates	August 8, 2002	Palomar	S. F. Hönig	·	3.8 km	MPC · JPL
68949	2002 QN_{6}	—	August 19, 2002	Kvistaberg	Uppsala-DLR Asteroid Survey	·	2.5 km	MPC · JPL
68950	2002 QF_{15}	—	August 27, 2002	Socorro	LINEAR	APO +1km · PHA	1.6 km	MPC · JPL
68951	2002 QH_{27}	—	August 28, 2002	Palomar	NEAT	·	3.0 km	MPC · JPL
68952	2002 QC_{29}	—	August 29, 2002	Palomar	NEAT	·	4.3 km	MPC · JPL
68953	2002 RS	—	September 3, 2002	Nashville	Clingan, R.	THM	6.0 km	MPC · JPL
68954	2002 RB_{3}	—	September 4, 2002	Anderson Mesa	LONEOS	·	5.5 km	MPC · JPL
68955	2002 RR_{12}	—	September 4, 2002	Anderson Mesa	LONEOS	THM	6.1 km	MPC · JPL
68956	2002 RD_{18}	—	September 4, 2002	Anderson Mesa	LONEOS	·	5.8 km	MPC · JPL
68957	2002 RE_{25}	—	September 4, 2002	Anderson Mesa	LONEOS	ERI	3.9 km	MPC · JPL
68958	2002 RT_{32}	—	September 4, 2002	Anderson Mesa	LONEOS	·	1.6 km	MPC · JPL
68959	2002 RX_{45}	—	September 5, 2002	Socorro	LINEAR	MAS	2.0 km	MPC · JPL
68960	2002 RE_{49}	—	September 5, 2002	Socorro	LINEAR	V	1.5 km	MPC · JPL
68961	2002 RE_{50}	—	September 5, 2002	Socorro	LINEAR	·	4.0 km	MPC · JPL
68962	2002 RC_{52}	—	September 5, 2002	Socorro	LINEAR	·	3.7 km	MPC · JPL
68963	2002 RO_{63}	—	September 5, 2002	Socorro	LINEAR	·	1.6 km	MPC · JPL
68964	2002 RV_{75}	—	September 5, 2002	Socorro	LINEAR	·	3.2 km	MPC · JPL
68965	2002 RH_{88}	—	September 5, 2002	Socorro	LINEAR	KOR	3.6 km	MPC · JPL
68966	2002 RA_{94}	—	September 5, 2002	Socorro	LINEAR	·	1.6 km	MPC · JPL
68967	2002 RN_{95}	—	September 5, 2002	Socorro	LINEAR	·	5.0 km	MPC · JPL
68968	2002 RS_{101}	—	September 5, 2002	Socorro	LINEAR	(5)	2.3 km	MPC · JPL
68969	2002 RW_{101}	—	September 5, 2002	Socorro	LINEAR	·	2.6 km	MPC · JPL
68970	2002 RK_{102}	—	September 5, 2002	Socorro	LINEAR	·	3.8 km	MPC · JPL
68971	2002 RK_{104}	—	September 5, 2002	Socorro	LINEAR	·	2.0 km	MPC · JPL
68972	2002 RJ_{106}	—	September 5, 2002	Socorro	LINEAR	·	2.2 km	MPC · JPL
68973	2002 RW_{106}	—	September 5, 2002	Socorro	LINEAR	GEF	3.7 km	MPC · JPL
68974	2002 RO_{107}	—	September 5, 2002	Socorro	LINEAR	·	2.2 km	MPC · JPL
68975	2002 RU_{107}	—	September 5, 2002	Socorro	LINEAR	·	5.6 km	MPC · JPL
68976	2002 RJ_{116}	—	September 6, 2002	Socorro	LINEAR	·	1.8 km	MPC · JPL
68977	2002 RE_{127}	—	September 10, 2002	Palomar	NEAT	·	3.8 km	MPC · JPL
68978	2002 RN_{133}	—	September 10, 2002	Palomar	NEAT	·	1.7 km	MPC · JPL
68979	2002 RJ_{173}	—	September 13, 2002	Socorro	LINEAR	EUN	3.0 km	MPC · JPL
68980	2002 RP_{181}	—	September 13, 2002	Starkenburg Observatory	Starkenburg	·	7.2 km	MPC · JPL
68981	2002 SO_{27}	—	September 29, 2002	Haleakala	NEAT	·	3.0 km	MPC · JPL
68982	2002 SR_{29}	—	September 28, 2002	Haleakala	NEAT	V	2.4 km	MPC · JPL
68983	2002 SB_{40}	—	September 30, 2002	Haleakala	NEAT	·	2.8 km	MPC · JPL
68984	2002 SF_{57}	—	September 30, 2002	Socorro	LINEAR	·	4.2 km	MPC · JPL
68985	2002 TK_{10}	—	October 2, 2002	Socorro	LINEAR	·	7.2 km	MPC · JPL
68986	2002 TN_{28}	—	October 2, 2002	Socorro	LINEAR	KOR	3.0 km	MPC · JPL
68987	2002 TT_{32}	—	October 2, 2002	Socorro	LINEAR	·	4.1 km	MPC · JPL
68988	2002 TU_{34}	—	October 2, 2002	Socorro	LINEAR	THM	6.3 km	MPC · JPL
68989	2002 TP_{39}	—	October 2, 2002	Socorro	LINEAR	MIS	5.2 km	MPC · JPL
68990	2002 TY_{44}	—	October 2, 2002	Socorro	LINEAR	·	6.5 km	MPC · JPL
68991	2002 TK_{45}	—	October 2, 2002	Socorro	LINEAR	·	4.6 km	MPC · JPL
68992	2002 TF_{54}	—	October 2, 2002	Socorro	LINEAR	BRA	4.1 km	MPC · JPL
68993	2002 TF_{72}	—	October 3, 2002	Palomar	NEAT	·	4.6 km	MPC · JPL
68994	2002 TK_{91}	—	October 3, 2002	Palomar	NEAT	·	3.6 km	MPC · JPL
68995	2002 TF_{112}	—	October 3, 2002	Socorro	LINEAR	·	4.8 km	MPC · JPL
68996	2002 TN_{135}	—	October 4, 2002	Socorro	LINEAR	·	2.6 km	MPC · JPL
68997	2002 TE_{136}	—	October 4, 2002	Anderson Mesa	LONEOS	NAE	11 km	MPC · JPL
68998	2002 TC_{157}	—	October 5, 2002	Palomar	NEAT	·	7.9 km	MPC · JPL
68999	2002 TQ_{157}	—	October 5, 2002	Palomar	NEAT	·	2.8 km	MPC · JPL
69000	2002 TL_{173}	—	October 4, 2002	Socorro	LINEAR	·	4.2 km	MPC · JPL

back to top

== See also ==
- Meanings of minor-planet names: 68001–69000
