= Vytautas Straižys =

Lithuanian astronomer (1936–2021)

Vytautas Pranciškus Straižys
- Born: 20 August 1936; Utena, Lithuania
- Died: 19 December 2021 (aged 85); Vilnius, Lithuania
- Education: Vilnius University
- Known for: Vilnius photometric system, stellar classification
- Scientific career
- Fields: Astronomy and astrophysics
- Workplaces: Molėtai Astronomical Observatory

Vytautas Straižys (20 August 1936 – 19 December 2021) was a Lithuanian astronomer. In 1963–65 he and his collaborators created and developed the Vilnius photometric system, a seven-color intermediate band system, optimized for photometric stellar classification. In 1996 he was elected a Corresponding Member of the Lithuanian Academy of Sciences. Straižys was an editor of the journal Baltic Astronomy. He spent a lot of time working at the Molėtai Astronomical Observatory. Asteroid 68730 Straizys in 2002 was named after him.

== Early life and professional history ==
Straižys was born in Utena on 20 August 1936. In 1959, he graduated from Vilnius University in astrophysics. In 1959–62, he was a graduate student of the Institute of Physics and Mathematics of the Lithuanian Academy of Sciences. In 1962–67, he was a scientific researcher at the same institute. From 1967 to 1990, he headed the Astrophysical Department of the Institute of Physics, Vilnius. In 1990–2003, he was the head of the Astronomical Observatory of the Institute of Theoretical Physics and Astronomy of Vilnius University. In 1991–96 Associate Director of the same Institute. In 2003, he became a chief researcher. In 2013, he became a professor emeritus. In 1992–93 academic year: visiting professor in Union College, Schenectady, New York.

== Scientific activity ==
Main directions of the scientific research: multicolor photometry of stars, stellar physical parameters, stellar classification, interstellar extinction, interstellar clouds, star clusters, Galactic structure. One of the authors of the Vilnius photometric system for the classification of stars. In 1969–90 conducted the construction of the Molėtai Observatory in Lithuania and the Maidanak Observatory in Uzbekistan. He was author of 324 scientific papers published between 1957 and 2009 and of three monographs: Multicolor Stellar Photometry (Vilnius, 1977, in Russian), Metal-Deficient Stars (Vilnius, 1982, in Russian) and Multicolor Stellar Photometry (Tucson, Arizona, 1992 and 1995, revised version, in English). From 1977 to 1991 he was editor of the Bulletin of the Vilnius Astronomical Observatory, from 1992 to 2021 editor of an international journal Baltic Astronomy. Scientific adviser of 22 doctoral dissertations.

== Personal life and death ==
Straižys died on 19 December 2021, at the age of 85.

== Membership ==
- International Astronomical Union (IAU, 1967)
- Institute for Space Observations, New York (1988)
- European Astronomical Society (EAS, 1990)
- American Astronomical Society (AAS, 1991)
- Astronomical Society of the Pacific (ASP, 1991)
- American Planetary Society (1991)
- Astronomical Society of New York (1992)
- Lithuanian Astronomical Union (president 1995–2003)
- Vice-President and President of the IAU Commission on Stellar Classification (1979–85)
- Expert Member (1991–95) and Corresponding Member (since 1996) of the Lithuanian Academy of Sciences

== Honours ==
Awards

- Lithuanian Republic Science Award (1973)
- Nomination as a distinguished scientist of Lithuania (1986)
- Chretien Grant of the American Astronomical Society (2000)
- Order of the Lithuanian Grand Duke Gediminas, Officer's Cross (2003)
- Lithuanian National Science Award (2004)

Named after him

- Asteroid 68730 Straizys

== Publications ==
- V. Straizys, Multicolor Stellar Photometry (in Russian), Mokslas Publishers, Vilnius, Lithuania, 1977
- V. Straizys, Metal-Deficient Stars (in Russian), Mokslas Publishers, Vilnius, Lithuania, 1982
- V. Straizys, Multicolor Stellar Photometry (in English), Pachart Publishing House, Tucson, Arizona, 1992 (2nd publication in 1995)
- V. Straizys, The Milky Way (in Lithuanian), Mokslas Publishers, 1992
- V. Straizys, Astronomy, 1993 (a textbook for secondary schools, in Lithuanian)
- A. Azusienis, A. Pucinskas, V. Straizys, Astronomy, 1995 (a textbook for universities, in Lithuanian, 2nd revised publication in 2003)
- V. Straizys, Astronomical Encyclopedic Dictionary (in Lithuanian), Institute of Theoretical Physics and Astronomy, 2002 (2nd publication in 2003)
