= Open Astronomy =

- Discipline: Astronomy
- Language: English
- Edited by: Beatriz Barbuy

Publication details
- Former name: Baltic Astronomy
- History: 1992-present
- Publisher: De Gruyter Open
- Open access: Yes
- Impact factor: 0.439 (Baltic Astronomy) (2016)

Standard abbreviations
- ISO 4: Open Astron.

Indexing
- ISSN: 2543-6376
- LCCN: 95640784
- OCLC no.: 50136117
- Baltic Astronomy
- ISSN: 1392-0049

Links
- Journal homepage; Tables of contents of Baltic Astronomy

Open Astronomy (formerly Baltic Astronomy) is a peer-reviewed fully open access scientific journal, and currently published by De Gruyter Open. The journal was established in 1992 by the Institute of Theoretical Physics and Astronomy (Vilnius University, Lithuania) as Baltic Astronomy, obtaining its current title in 2017 when it converted to open access. The journal is devoted to publishing research, reviews and news spanning all aspects of astronomy and astrophysics. The editor in chief is Prof. Beatriz Barbuy (IAG, University of São Paulo).

== History ==
Open Astronomy is the continuation of publishing in the open access model of Baltic Astronomy, which was published by the Institute of Theoretical Physics and Astronomy in Vilnius for astronomical institutions of the Baltic states.

The political liberation in the then Soviet Union during the later part of the 1980s enabled increased international contacts. For greater international visibility, a modern journal publishing in English was desired, replacing several less visible publication series from the observatories in Tartu, Riga, and Vilnius. Each of those had, during Soviet rule, published mainly in Russian. Following discussions among the Baltic astronomical institutes, it was agreed to discontinue those publications once Baltic Astronomy was launched.

Some regrets were expressed for the discontinuation of the long-running Publications of the Tartu Astrophysical Observatory (Estonian title: W.Struve nimelise Tartu Astrofüüsika Observatooriumi Publikatsioonid), which, with some name variants, had been published at Tartu Observatory since 1817 (Latin title of its volume 1: Observationes Astronomicas, Institutas In Specula Universitatis Caesareae Dorpatensis: Observationes Annorum 1814 Et 1815, Una Cum Reductionibus). Its final volume 53 appeared in 1990. Also the more recent Proceedings of the Tartu Astrophysical Observatory (Estonian title: W.Struve nimeline Tartu Astrofüüsika Teated), started in 1954, were concluded with its number 109 in 1991. In Latvia, the publication series Investigations of the Sun and Red Stars by the Radioastrophysocal Observatory of the Latvian Academy of Sciences in Riga (Latvian title: Saules un sarkano zvaigžņu pētīšana), started in 1974, published its final volume 36 in 1993. In Lithuania, the Bulletin of the Vilnius Astronomical Observatory (Lithuanian title: Vilnius Astronomijos Observatorijos Biuletenis), founded in 1960 (published by Vilnius University Astronomical Observatory, in collaboration with the Institute of Physics and Mathematics), issued its final volume 86 in 1992.

Baltic Astronomy was sponsored by the Ministry of Education and Science (Lithuania), and published quarterly (4 issues per year). Its final volume 25 appeared in 2016. Its editor in chief since the journal's inception in 1992 was Vytautas Straižys.

== Abstracting and indexing ==
The journal is abstracted and indexed by:

- Astrophysics Data System
- Current Contents/Physical, Chemical & Earth Sciences
- Inspec
- Science Citation Index Expanded
- Scopus
- VINITI/Referativny Zhurnal Astronomija
