= Beatriz Barbuy =

Brazilian astronomer (born 1950)

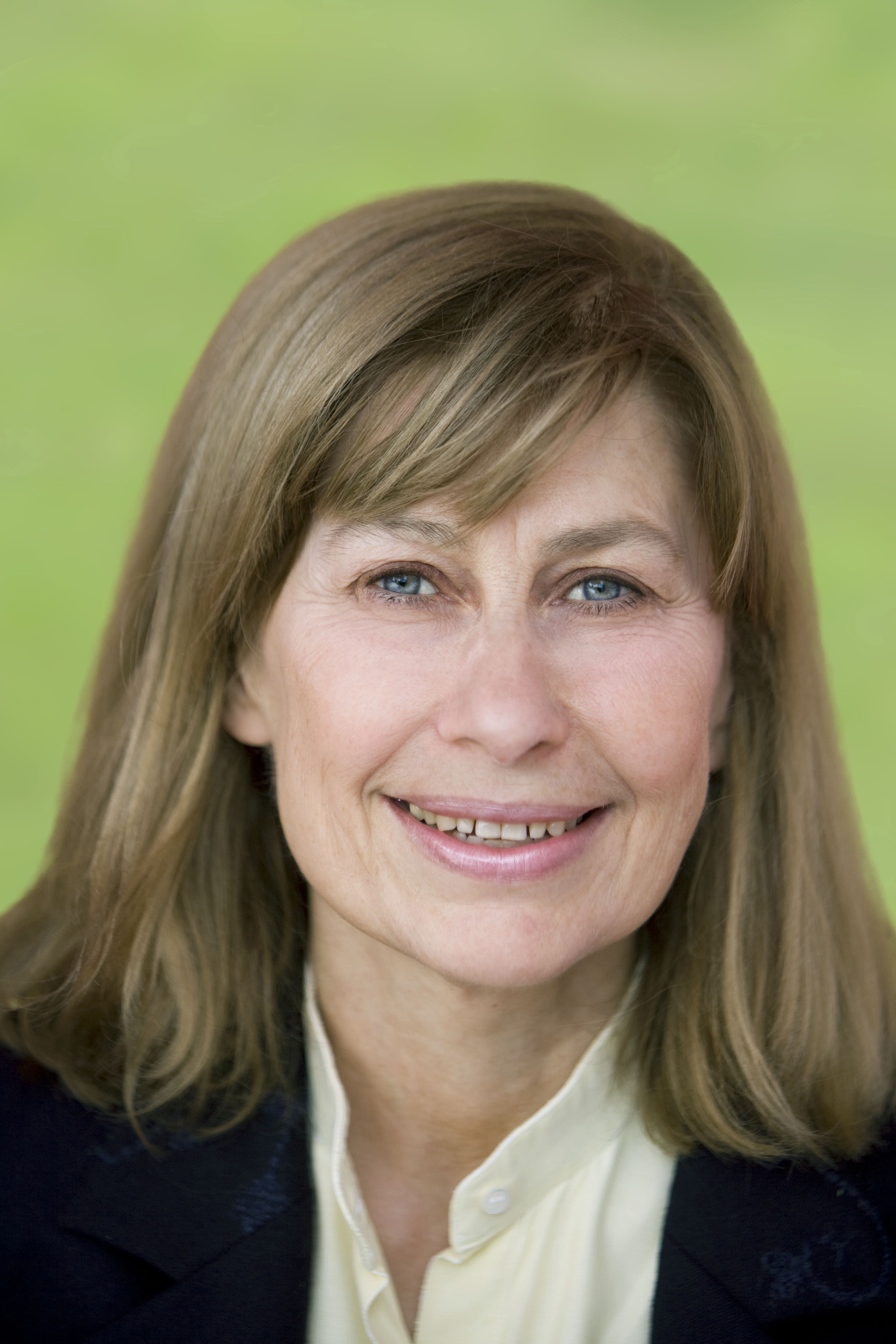
- Micheline Pelletier/Fondation L'Oréal
- Born: February 16, 1950 (age 76); São Paulo, Brasil
- Awards: L'Oréal-UNESCO Awards for Women in Science; National Order of Scientific Merit (Brazil)
- Scientific career
- Fields: Astrophysics, astronomy, education
- Workplaces: University of São Paulo

Beatriz Leonor Silveira Barbuy is a Brazilian astrophysicist. She was described in 2009 by Época magazine as one of the 100 most influential Brazilians. She is a professor at the Instituto de Astronomia, Geofísica e Ciências Atmosféricas (IAG) at the University of São Paulo, vice-president of the International Astronomical Union (IAU), and one of five winners of the L'Oréal-UNESCO Awards for Women in Science in 2009.

== Career ==
Barbuy completed undergraduate and master's degrees at the University of São Paulo in the early 1970s. When she considered writing a thesis in astrophysics at the time of the Brazilian military government in the 1970s, it was not possible to do it in Brazil: classmates and faculty at the University of São Paulo were being imprisoned or disappearing.

In 1978, Barbuy moved to France and began her doctoral research in Roger Cayrel's group at the Paris Observatory. Her thesis focused on the elements carbon, nitrogen and oxygen in stars with ages between zero and 12 billion years, in research which allowed reconstruction of the evolution of the quantities of these elements since the formation of the galaxy to the present day.

Between 2001 and 2005, she played an important role in the international program on the formation of the first stars, led by the European Southern Observatory (ESO). This program obtained detailed information about the chemical composition of stars formed more than 10 billion years ago. She was elected president of the stellar division of the International Astronomical Union, and as vice president of that organization.

In 2005 she was awarded the title of Commander of the National Order of Scientific Merit by the Brazilian Academy of Sciences.

In 2009, she was one of five winners of the L'Oréal-UNESCO Awards for Women in Science, awarded for her work in physics on 5 March at a ceremony at UNESCO headquarters in Paris. She subsequently returned to Brazil to take up the post of professor at the University of São Paulo.

== Selected publications ==
- David Burstein; Yong Li; Kenneth C. Freeman; John E. Norris; Michael S. Bessell; Joss Bland-Hawthorn; Brad K. Gibson; Michael A. Beasley; Hyun-Chul Lee; Beatriz Barbuy; et al. (2004). "Globular Cluster and Galaxy Formation: M31, the Milky Way, and Implications for Globular Cluster Systems of Spiral Galaxies". The Astrophysical Journal. 614 (1): 158–166. arXiv:astro-ph/0406564. Bibcode:2004ApJ...614..158B. doi:10.1086/423334. S2CID 56003193.
- Beatriz Barbuy; B.V. Castillo; J. Gregorio-Hetem. (1992). "A Criterion to Select Li-Rich Giants". Physical Processes in Astrophysics. Proceedings of a Meeting in Honour of Évry Schatzman Held in Paris, France. ISBN 3-540-60259-3.
