= 68109 Naomipasachoff =

Main-belt asteroid

Discovery
- Discovered by: LONEOS
- Discovery site: Anderson Mesa Stn.
- Discovery date: 17 December 2000

Designations
- Named after: Naomi Pasachoff (American biographer)
- Alternative designations: 2000 YH_{135} · 2000 XZ_{54} 2002 CY_{169}
- Minor planet category: main-belt · (inner) background

Orbital characteristics
- Epoch 4 September 2017 (JD 2458000.5)
- Uncertainty parameter 0
- Observation arc: 18.92 yr (6,909 days)
- Aphelion: 2.7247 AU
- Perihelion: 2.2163 AU
- Semi-major axis: 2.4705 AU
- Eccentricity: 0.1029
- Orbital period (sidereal): 3.88 yr (1,418 days)
- Mean anomaly: 238.53°
- Mean motion: 0° 15^{m} 13.68^{s} / day
- Inclination: 8.7285°
- Longitude of ascending node: 119.05°
- Argument of perihelion: 171.04°

Physical characteristics
- Mean diameter: 3.581±0.061 km
- Geometric albedo: 0.218±0.059
- Absolute magnitude (H): 15.0

68109 Naomipasachoff (provisional designation 2000 YH_{135}) is a background asteroid from the inner regions of the asteroid belt, approximately 3.5 kilometers in diameter. It was discovered on 17 December 2000, by astronomers of the LONEOS program at the Anderson Mesa Station in the United States. The asteroid was named after American biographer and research associate, Naomi Pasachoff.

== Orbit and classification ==
Naomipasachoff is a non-family from the main belt's background population. It orbits the Sun in the inner asteroid belt at a distance of 2.2–2.7 AU once every 3 years and 11 months (1,418 days; semi-major axis of 2.47 AU). Its orbit has an eccentricity of 0.10 and an inclination of 9° with respect to the ecliptic.

The body's observation arc begins with a precovery taken at Lincoln Laboratory ETS in March 1998, more than 2 years prior to its official discovery observation at Anderson Mesa.

== Naming ==
This minor planet was named by LONEOS-astronomer Edward Bowell after American biographer and research associate, Naomi Pasachoff (born 1947), who has written several scientific biographies. Her published work includes biographies of Marie Curie, Alexander Graham Bell, Niels Bohr, Isaac Newton, Albert Einstein, Linus Pauling. She is also an amateur astronomer. The official naming citation was published by the Minor Planet Center on 6 January 2007 (M.P.C. 58596).

== Physical characteristics ==
=== Rotation period ===
As of 2018, no rotational lightcurve of Naomipasachoff has been obtained from photometric observations. The body's rotation period, pole and shape remain unknown.

=== Diameter and albedo ===
According to the survey carried out by the NEOWISE mission of NASA's Wide-field Infrared Survey Explorer, Naomipasachoff measures 3.581 kilometers in diameter and its surface has an albedo of 0.218. Based on its albedo and its location in the inner asteroid belt, Naomipasachoff is possibly a common, stony S-type asteroid.
