= Georg Albert Fuss =

Russian astronomer (1806–1854)

- Егор Николаевич Фусс
- Born: 13 December 1806; Saint Petersburg, Russian Empire
- Died: 6 January 1854 (aged 47); Vilna, Russian Empire
- Education: Saint Petersburg State University; University of Dorpat
- Occupation: Astronomer
- Father: Nicolas Fuss

Georg Albert Fuss (Russian: Егор Николаевич Фус; Lithuanian: Jegoras Fusas; 13 December 1806 – 6 January 1854) was a Russian astronomer and the seventh director of the Vilna University Astronomical Observatory (1848–1854). He was the son of Nicolas Fuss, and brother of Paul Fuss.

== Biography ==
Fuss was born in Saint Petersburg to Nicolas Fuss, a mathematician of Swiss descent. He went to the Second Saint Petersburg Gymnasium. Fuss studied at Saint Petersburg University as well as the University of Dorpat. From 1830 to 1833, Fuss participated in geodesic expeditions in China and Mongolia. In 1835 Fuss studied in Germany, France, and England. Teachers of Fuss included Friedrich Georg Wilhelm von Struve and Vikenty Vishnevsky.

In 1836, he was part of an expedition that measured the sea level difference of the Caspian Sea and the Black Sea. He also published a work on magnetism in 1838. From 1839 to 1837 Fuss was an assistant in Pulkovo Observatory, measuring star coordinates for a fundamental catalog. When Fuss became director of the Vilna Astronomical Observatory in 1848, it was very poorly maintained. The observatory's state would get better in 1852 with the arrival of Matvey Gusev and the appointment of Georg Thomas Sabler as director after Fuss's death.

Fuss died on 6 January 1854 in Vilna.

== Sources ==
- "Фусс, Георг-Альберт" . Brockhaus and Efron Encyclopedic Dictionary (in Russian). 1906.
