= Piotr Sławinski =

Polish astronomer (1795–1881)

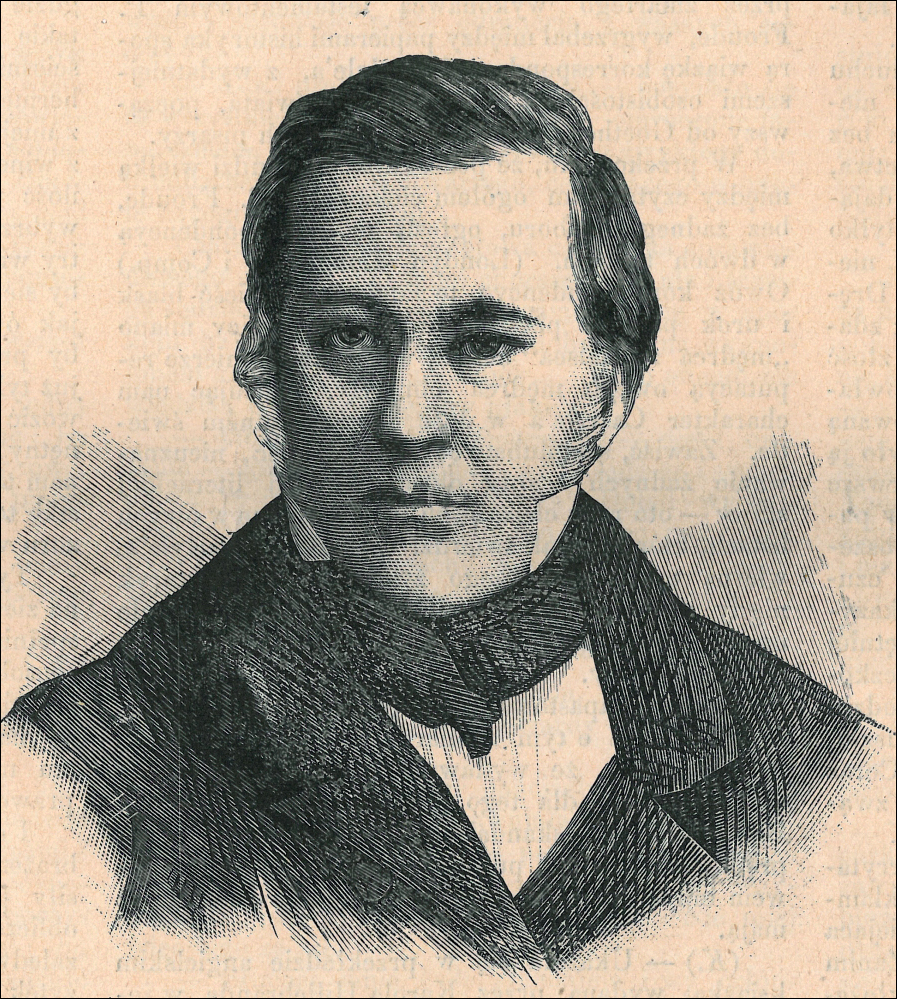
- Born: Piotr Sławinski; 29 June 1795; Kena, Polish-Lithuanian Commonwealth
- Died: 30 May 1881 (aged 86); Kena, Russian Empire
- Education: Vilnius University (master's degree; 1815) (doctorate; 1817)
- Known for: Planetary observation Founder of the Royal Astronomical Society
- Spouse: Emilia née Krassowska
- Scientific career
- Fields: Astronomy
- Workplaces: Vilnius University Astronomical Observatory
- Doctoral advisor: Jan Śniadecki

Piotr Sławinski (Lithuanian: Petras Slavinskis; 29 June 1795 – 30 May 1881) was a Polish astronomer of the Russian Empire. He was the fifth director of the Vilnius University Astronomical Observatory (1825–1843) and one of the founders of the Royal Astronomical Society in 1820, being its youngest.

== Biography ==
=== Early life ===
Piotr Sławinski was born on 29 June 1795 in the Kena manor, near modern-day Vilnius. His home country of the Polish-Lithuanian Commonwealth would cease to exist just a few months later after the partitions by the Habsburg monarchy, the Kingdom of Prussia, and the Russian Empire. He was named after Saint Peter as his birth coincided with the Feast of Saints Peter and Paul, which is observed on 29 June. His parents were Jan Sławinski, a landowner, and Marianna née Mackiewicz. At sixteen years old in 1811 Sławinski was already a student of the physics-mathematics department of Vilnius University, studying mathematics and philosophy. In 1815 Sławinski defended his master's degree, and was appointed as a student assistant of the Vilnius University Astronomical Observatory. Two years later, in 1817, he gained his doctoral degree for his work on eclipses. The rector of the university and director of the university's observatory Jan Śniadecki invited Sławinski to become his assistant and read lectures on astronomy. Supposedly, Sławinski inspired Ignacy Domeyko, who was later a dissident and scientist of Chile. Śniadecki was known for demanding not only talent, but also hard work and complete dedication to science from his assistants.

=== Travels ===
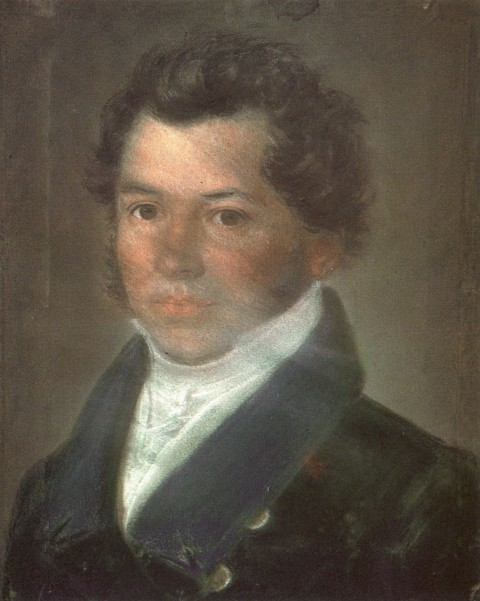
Portrait of Sławinski

In August 1819, Sławinski was sent to an internship abroad to get acquainted with new observational methods and order needed appliances for the observatory back home. In his journey, Sławinski visited observatories in Königsberg, Berlin, Gotha, Göttingen, Bremen, and finally, London. Later, he visited most of the observatories in England. Sławinski became acquainted with prominent astronomers such as Friedrich Wilhelm Bessel, Johann Elert Bode, and Heinrich Wilhelm Matthias Olbers. Sławinski was invited to a celebration for the start of work on the new William Herschel telescopes. Honored guests like Sławinski signed on the telescope stand, and the signatures were later engraved. In 1820 he participated in the establishment of the Royal Astronomical Society and was the youngest of its founders. He was also its first foreign member.

To bring back to the observatory, Sławinski selected and ordered a quality clock made by William Hardy, corresponding with William Pearson on determining accurate clock rates. He also ordered a parallax mount made by Dollond and Co. After sending these instruments back to Vilnius, Sławinski traveled to Paris in August 1820 to listen to Jean-Baptiste Biot's lectures.

=== Astronomer in Vilnius ===
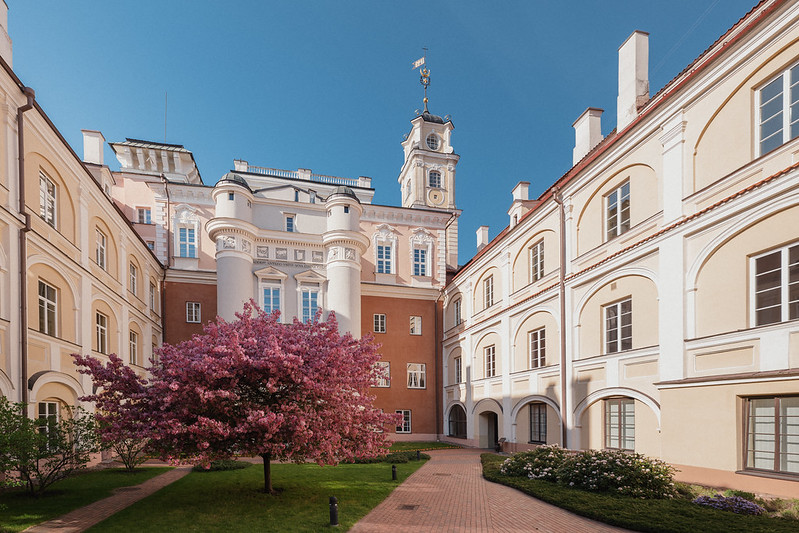
Present-day Observatory courtyard

At the end of 1822, Sławinski returned to Vilnius, where he was made adjunct professor of Vilnius University. Sławinski's students enjoyed him for his gentleman-like, elegant appearance and engaging explanation of natural phenomena. Sławinski's first scientific works, which were conducted in 1825–1832, were related to triangulation and the calculation of Earth's meridian arc, headed by famous geodesist and military general Carl Friedrich Tenner. Sławinski and others calculated the triangulation web of the Russian Empire in Lithuania and Courland. In 1825, Śniadecki retired, and Sławinski became the director of the university's observatory. Shortly after writing a textbook on the theoretical and practical rudiments of astronomy (Początki Astronomii Teoretyczney i Praktyczney) in 1826, Sławinski became a university professor. By 1827, he was in charge of sending accounts of planetary observations to the Royal Astronomical Society. A paper of his was read at the ordinary meeting in April 1829.

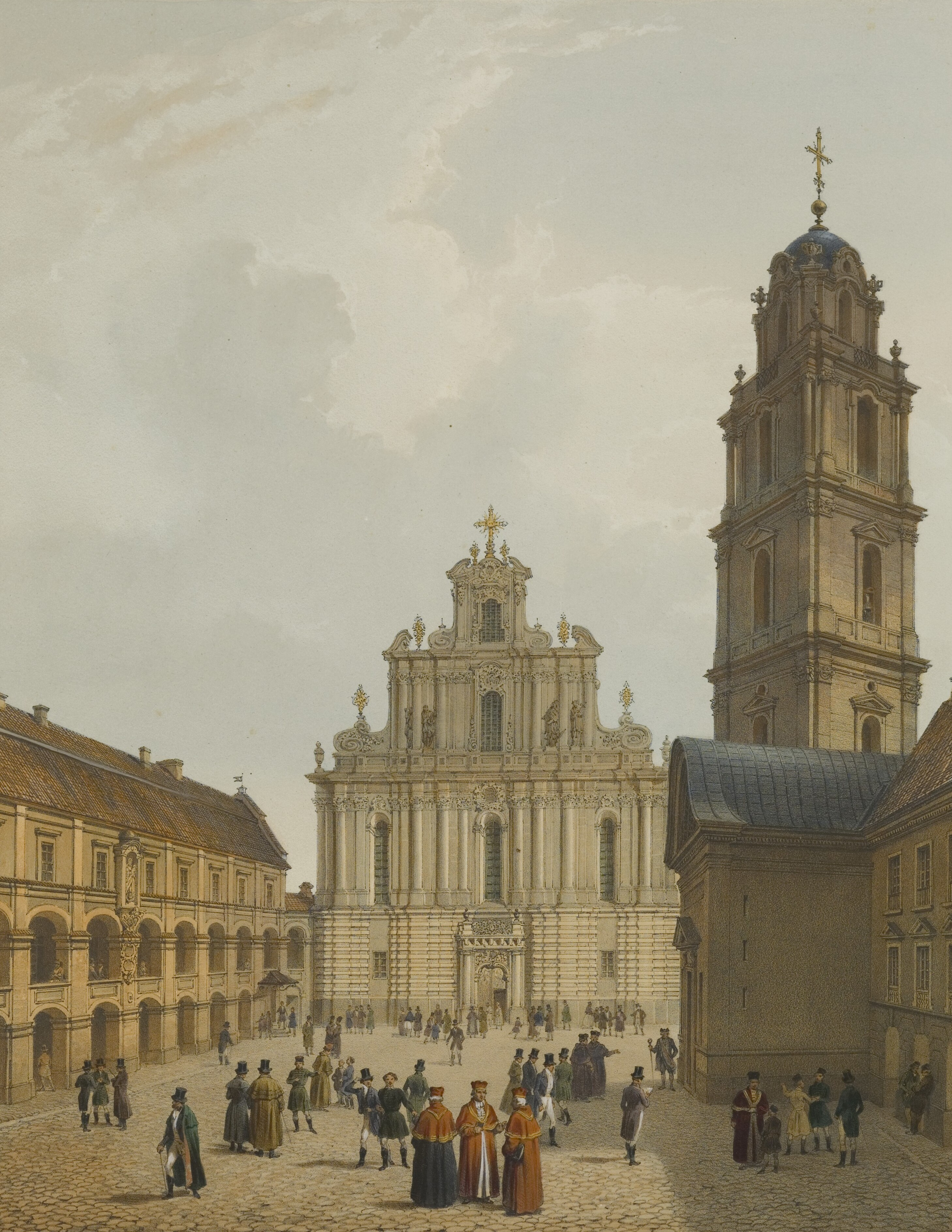
The Grand Courtyard of Vilnius University and the Church of St. John, Jan Kazimierz Wilczyński, drawing, circa 1850

After the failed November Uprising of 1830–1831, the government of the Russian Empire closed down Vilnius University. The fate of the university's observatory would be determined by the St. Petersburg Academy of Sciences. Since the construction was funded by countess Elżbieta Ogińska-Puzynina, and no information was found about Sławinski's participation in the uprising, the observatory was allowed to continue working under Sławinski's leadership. Sławinski married Emilia Krassowska in 1831 or 1832, with whom he had two sons and a daughter. In 1834 Sławinski ordered a telescope-refractor of a 6-inch lens diameter that worked on a clockwork mechanism. To install the telescope-refractor, one of the towers of the observatory had to be rebuilt, sacrificing its elegant architecture. In 1835–1842, the first reports of observations from the university's observatory were published. The topics were usually the positions of smaller planets, occultations, and the eclipses of Jupiter's moons. Collaborating with Michał Hłuszniewicz in 1838–1843, Sławinski also continued the tradition of publishing calendars intended to popularize science, which was started during the directorship of Marcin Odlanicki Poczobutt. In 1834, he presented a project to move the observatory from the university complex to one of the hills in the vicinity of Vilnius, but the project was not accepted. Sławinski also was made a member-correspondent of the St. Petersburg Academy of Sciences, the Palermo Academy of Science and Literature, as well as an honorary member of Imperial Kharkiv University.

=== Later years ===
In 1839 Sławinski and others participated in the opening of the Pulkovo Observatory. In 1843 the St. Petersburg Academy of Sciences ordered that a large part of the Vilnius University observatory's library (487 volumes in total, one-third of all the books) be transferred to Pulkovo Observatory. Sławinski could not reject the order, since his observatory was subordinate to the one in Pulkovo. That same year, Sławinski promptly resigned from his position as director; it is believed that the aforementioned confiscation of books was the real reason he retired. It has also been suggested that Sławinski's fieldwork had damaged his health, suffering from severe encephalitis.

Sławinski inherited his father's farm and then turned to farming at his home in Kena for the next thirty-eight years. A large fire in 1855 burned Sławinski's archive of letters and books dedicated to him.

Sławinski died on 30 June 1881. The Vilnius University observatory closed that same year. Sławinski was buried in Rasos Cemetery. According to another source, he was buried in Kena.

== Remembrance ==
His gravestone was restored in 2017 after a successful financial appeal by a Polish radio station. He was described as a "well-deserved professor of astronomy". At the 150th jubilee of the Royal Astronomical Society, Sławinski's surviving textbook on astronomy with his signature, and a medal of Nicolaus Copernicus he gifted to the society, was exhibited.
