= Bernardas Kodatis =

Lithuanian astronomer (1879–1959)

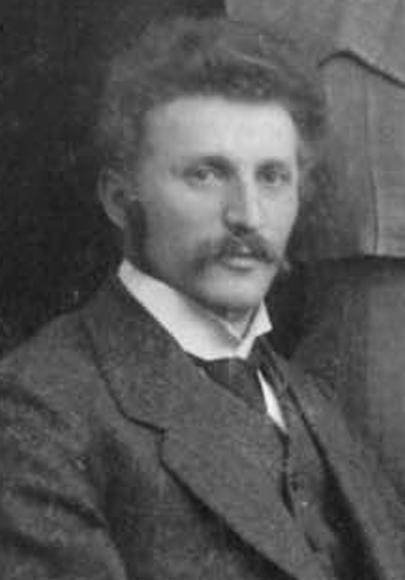
- Bernardas Kodatis, circa 1911
- Born: Bernardas Otonas Liudvikas Kodatis; 18 July 1879; Potsdam, German Empire
- Died: 5 July 1957 (aged 77); Chicago, United States
- Education: University of Berlin (doctorate; 1910)
- Spouse: Viktorija Kodatienė née Gruzdytė
- Scientific career
- Fields: Astronomy, geodesy
- Workplaces: Kaunas 1st Fort Observatory, Vilnius University Astronomical Observatory, Royal Astronomical Institute of Dahlem

Bernardas Otonas Liudvikas Kodatis (Note: Also spelled Kuodatis or Kuodaitis.) (18 July 1879 – 5 July 1957) was a Lithuanian astronomer and geodesist who was twelfth director of the Vilnius University Astronomical Observatory (1940–1944). He is remembered for giving rise to the science of astronomy in inter-war Lithuania, helping to raise a new generation of astronomers including Paulius Slavėnas, Antanas Juška, and Česlovas Masaitis.

== Biography ==
=== Early life ===
Bernardas Otonas Liudvikas Kodatis was born on 18 July 1879 in Potsdam, the German Empire. (Note: His domestic passport has Berlin listed as his birthplace.) His father Augustinas died when Kodatis was eleven years old. Kodatis's uncle Otto, an editor in a German publishing house, subsequently took care of the family. Otto was well-versed in the history of Lithuania and Lithuania Minor, and would remind the young Kodatis of his family's roots in Samogitia (Kodatis's great-grandfather was from that region). Kodatis also made his own family tree. At a gymnasium, Kodatis learned the Lithuanian language and traveled to Lithuania during vacations. In Berlin, Kodatis joined the Lithuanian Society of Berlin, and helped publishers to transport Lithuanian books to Russian-controlled Lithuania, as part of a larger Lithuanian book smuggler movement. Kodatis's house in Berlin quickly became a transit point for Lithuanian figures arriving or traveling further to Europe or the United States. For example, it is known that Povilas Višinskis died in Kodatis's house.

Kodatis, besides history, also was interested in astronomy. He constructed a homemade telescope out of a microscope and camera. To observe and determine the angular sizes of skylights, Kodatis constructed a sextant. He published his observations in the press. He also prepared a scientific study about the results of his measurements while he was in the last grade of the gymnasium, which was particularly well evaluated by the researchers of the University of Berlin. He graduated with a doctor's degree in 1910, Kodatis was invited to study astronomy or mathematics, but following his uncle's advice joined a teachers' seminary.

=== Teaching career ===
After graduating from the teachers' seminary, Kodatis nonetheless began studying astronomy, working as a mathematician in an observatory in the meantime. After finishing his studies, Kodatis did not stay at the university or the observatory, and instead moved to Lithuania Minor to teach along with his wife Viktorija Kodatienė née Gruzdytė. In 1910, Kodatis taught at Tawellningken (Lithuanian: Tovelninkai). In 1912, he moved to Kallningken (Lithuanian: Kalnininkai), and later, in 1914, to Endriušiai in Kreis Ragnit. Kodatis did not follow local law to teach in German, and instead taught in Lithuanian, which raised attention from German police. The police questioned Kodatis and suspected him and his wife of being Russian spies. At the same time, he performed calculations for the Royal Astronomical Institute in Dahlem.

=== First World War ===
In 1916, Kodatis was conscripted into the Imperial German Army's artillery unit stationed in Tilsit and Königsberg. However, after a few weeks of service, Kodatis was sent to edit the newly established Lithuanian-language newspaper Dabartis, as he was already a known astronomer and editor in Germany. A year later, he was appointed as an officer of the political board of the German occupation authorities. Because Kodatis knew members of the Council of Lithuania such as Antanas Smetona, Steponas Kairys, Jonas Vileišis, Jonas Basanavičius, Aleksandras Stulginskis and others, Kodatis usually transferred to them secret information coming to the occupation authorities from Berlin through the painter Antanas Žmuidzinavičius. The council, knowing what the occupiers were planning, could prepare in advance to counter their new attacks and coordinate activities. Since German authorities prohibited the publishing of the Act of Independence of Lithuania, Kodatis made sure that the document would be delivered to pro-Lithuanian Reichstag deputies in Berlin.

Towards 1918, when the Lithuanian Army began to be created, Kodatis organized the transfer of weapons to the Lithuanian military. After German intelligence learned of Kodatis's actions, he was arrested in Endružiai after being demobilized and consequently jailed in Tilsit for "betrayal of the fatherland". Although the typical punishment in this case would be the prisoner's execution, prime minister of Lithuania Mykolas Sleževičius's efforts freed Kodatis from prison. The German authorities then demanded that Kodatis depart Germany within twenty four hours.

=== Work in independent Lithuania ===
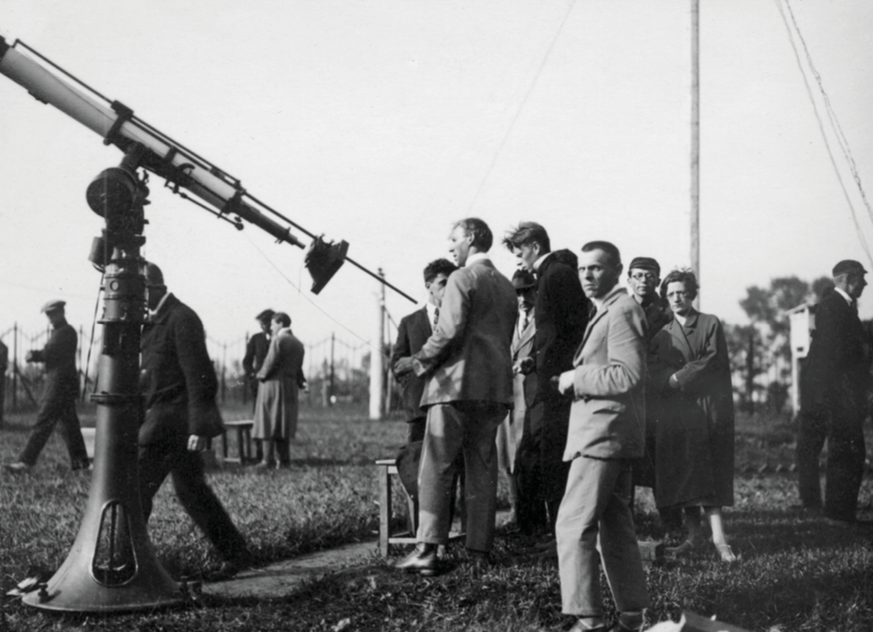
Solar eclipse in Lithuania, 1927

Kodatis subsequently moved to Kaunas, the temporary capital of Lithuania. Prime minister Sleževičius asked Kodatis to organize a large diplomatic archive, since Kodatis knew the French, Polish, Russian, and English languages. Kodatis was then appointed at the Ministry of Education, where he was tasked with preparing the country's education system and teacher seminars.

Kodatis was also a member of the Lithuanian Riflemen's Union. He helped uncover the plot of the Polish Military Organisation, and participated in the Klaipėda Revolt as a negotiator with the commanders of English and French warships. Kodatis was amongst the people working to establish the University of Lithuania in Kaunas. Kodatis became the university's professor of astronomy, geodesy, and mathematics. He founded an astronomical observatory near the Kaunas 1st Fort.

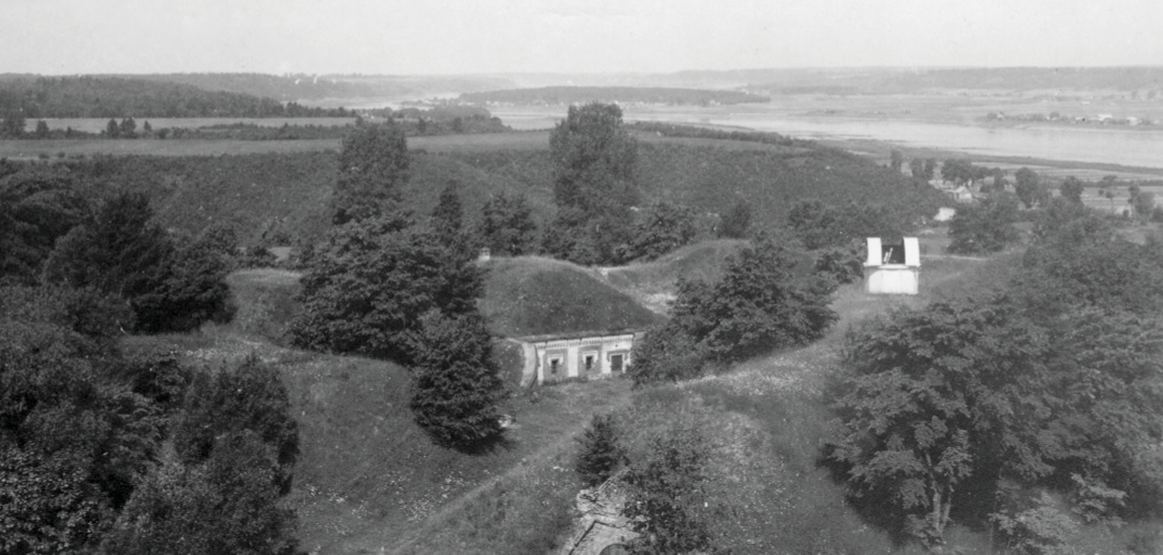
Kaunas observatory of the 1st Fort, c. 1930

Kodatis's astronomical work in mainly consisted of determining the coordinates of Lithuanian settlements and researching the Sun, Moon, and meteorites. Kodatis was head of the astronomical department of the University of Lithuania, and became a docent in 1923. The author of an astronomy textbook He also assisted in gravimetric and triangulation calculations of Lithuania in 1924. In 1926, along with the head of the military topography department, Kodatis prepared a first-order triangulation network in Lithuania, connected with the networks of Latvia and Germany. It was planned since 1927 to carry out triangulation works that covered 80 points in Lithuania with three main bases: Švėkšna, Skapiškis and Kaunas. Kodatis was also among the most active organizers, participants, and speakers of geodetic conferences in the Baltic States. The conferences not only discussed the results of triangulation measurements of the Baltic Sea, but also discussed the development of geodesy science and practice, the training of specialists, and other issues. Kodatis organized the search of the Padvarninkai meteorite in 1929, as well as calculating its orbit. Furthermore, Kodatis researched Sunspots. He published his findings in the science magazine Kosmos. Kodatis was awarded the Independence Medal as well as the Order of the Lithuanian Grand Duke Gediminas, 4th degree.

=== Second World War ===
After the Soviet occupation of Lithuania in 1940, Kodatis was made the director of the Vilnius University Astronomical Observatory. His former observatory near Kaunas was occupied by the Soviet army, and both observatories' research was halted. After Germany attacked the Soviet Union, the retreating Soviet army destroyed almost the entirety of the Kaunas 1st Fort observatory. The new German authorities began to limit astronomical research in Vilnius, and later on even prohibited Kodatis from entering the Vilnius observatory. However, like many lecturers of the time, Kodatis continued to secretly lecture to students. In his spare time, Kodatis summarized the results of his previous research and was the first to collect data on the development of the astronomical knowledge of Lithuanian folk since ancient times. Kodatis also saved the Vilnius observatory from an explosion in 1944. However, the approaching front and the retreat of the Lithuanian intelligentsia to the West forced Kodatis to do the same; after the Soviet army was near Vilnius, Kodatis with his family immigrated.

=== Immigration and later years ===
At first, Kodatis's family lived in Germany settled in Austria. After his son Kęstutis Augustas and wife settled in the United States and found a job, Kodatis, who was living in Wangen im Allgäu from 1944, got permission to join them in the country in 1951. However, Kodatis never managed to find a significant job, and his scientific work in the United States was never recognized. Kodatis died on 5 July 1957 in Chicago. He is buried in the Lithuanian National Cemetery.

== Bibliography ==
- Klimka, Libertas (2021). Vadovas po senąją Vilniaus universiteto astronomijos observatoriją (in Lithuanian). Vilnius: Vilnius University Press. ISBN 9786090705582.
