= Vilnius University Library =

University library in Lithuania

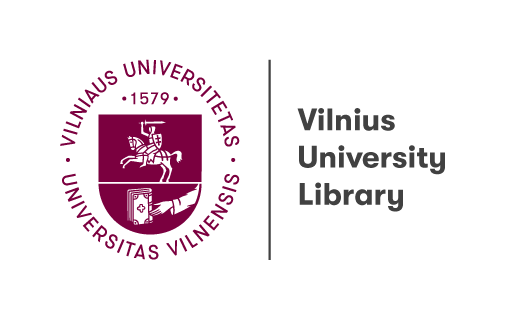
- 54°40′58″N 25°17′16″E
- Location: Universiteto g. 3, Vilnius, Lithuania
- Type: Academic library
- Established: 1579
- Branch of: Vilnius University

Collection
- Items collected: books, journals, newspapers, magazines, sound and music recordings, maps, prints, drawings and manuscripts

Access and use
- Members: Students and fellows of Vilnius University

Other information
- Director: Irena Krivienė
- Website: biblioteka.vu.lt/en

Vilnius University Library or VU Library (also VUL) is the oldest and one of the largest academic libraries of Lithuania. It was founded in 1570 by the Jesuits and as such is nine years older than Vilnius University. VU Library holds 5.4 million documents on shelves measuring 166 kilometres (103 mi) in length. The holdings, accessible to members of the university and wider public, include some of the oldest manuscripts, incunabula and engravings in Lithuania and Eastern Europe. At present the library has 36 thousand users.

Vilnius University Library consists of the Central Library which is situated near the Presidential Palace, the Scholarly Communication and Information Centre in Saulėtekis and libraries of faculties and centres that are scattered all around the city.

== History ==
=== Jesuit Order ===
Invited by Bishop of Vilnius Walerian Protasewicz, the Jesuits came to Vilnius in 1569. On 17 July 1570, they established a college and a library. The core of the library consisted of the collections of the Grand Duke of Lithuania and King of Poland Sigismund Augustus and suffragan bishop of Vilnius Georg Albinius. The library of Sigismund Augustus contained the best of classical works, travelogues, historical books, chronicles, and literature on natural science, law, military, and medicine published in the 16th century. It included the Bible translated by Martin Luther, works by Euclid and Claudius Ptolemaeus, the first edition of De revolutionibus orbium coelestium by Nicolaus Copernicus, and many other works.

Privileges issued by King Stephen Báthory on 1 April 1579, converted the Vilnius Jesuit College into a university, and the library into a university library. In 1580 Bishop Protasewicz bequeathed several thousand books to the library upon his death. Many of Lithuania's clergy and the nobility also donated books to the library.

During the 200 years of Jesuit rule at the university, the library collection grew from 4,500 volumes (in 1570) to 11,000 volumes (in 1773). A series of wars, fires and plunders prevented the library from growing further and a great many of its books ended up in libraries in Russia, Poland, Sweden and elsewhere.

After the suppression of the Jesuit Order in 1773, the Commission of National Education took on custody of the Vilnius University. In 1781 the university was renamed Head School of Lithuania. Its academic course altered, and the library fund was replenished with books on natural science and medicine.

=== Russian Empire ===
After the Third Partition of the Polish–Lithuanian Commonwealth in 1795, the greater portion of the Grand Duchy of Lithuania, including its capital Vilnius, became part of the Russian Empire. In 1803 the Head School of Lithuania was renamed the Vilnius Imperial University. By the 1820s, Vilnius University ranked among the leading universities in the Russian Empire; the revival of academic research had a positive effect on the library as well. In 1804 professor Gottfried Ernest Groddeck was appointed the head of the library. He succeeded in making it accessible to the public. A Lending Department was opened in 1815, and university staff and students, officials of the educational districts, and gymnasium teachers were allowed to borrow books. The library was moved to the Small Aula, which had a ninety-seat reading room. Groddeck initiated the compilation of an alphabetic and later a systemic card catalogue. Compared with other libraries in the Russian Empire, the Vilnius University Library had attained the most advanced European standards at that time.

After the November Uprising, Tsar Nicolas I closed the university on 1 May 1832. A large part of library's collection was taken from Vilnius and distributed to various academic institutions in Russia. There were unsuccessful attempts 1834 to establish a public library with the remaining books from the university library. In 1856 the Antiquities Museum and a reading room began to function under the auspices of the Archaeological Commission. In 1865 they were converted into the Vilnius Public Library and Museum. The library was given nearly 200,000 volumes of valuable books and manuscripts from the collections of schools, cloisters, and private libraries that had been closed after uprisings in 1831 and 1863. By 1914 the Vilnius Public Library contained more than 300,000 books and ranked 4th among the libraries in the Russian Empire. It was devastated during World War I, and books were once again transported to Russia.

=== After World War I ===
Vilnius University was reopened by Poles on 11 October 1919, and renamed in honor of Stephen Báthory. Though it had been plundered, the library retained a fairly large collection. During World War II, the library suffered again from plunder and fire. The destroyed university and its library needed rapid restoration after the war. Reading rooms were installed and bibliographical activities soon organized. The library managed to retrieve approximately 13,000 of its valuable publications.

The Vilnius University Library witnessed the following significant events during the period of 1945–1990: the 400th anniversary of the library and the university (in 1970 and 1979 accordingly), the building of two new book depositories, and founding of new departments. The early book collections needed restoration, and Jurgis Tornau, then director of the library, undertook to establish the Department of Restoration in 1968. The library acquired the Department of Graphic Arts in 1969. At the end of the 1960s a decision was made to safeguard integral collections from various donors in the main library depository.

=== After the regaining of independence by Lithuania ===
The library has had an electronic catalogue since 1993, accessible via the Internet since 1994. In 2000 VU Library together with other Lithuanian libraries started to subscribe to various databases, beginning with EBSCO, a universal database of full-text documents. On 1 December 2001 a user service sub-system enabling placing a request for an item via electronic catalogue from any study space equipped with computer was introduced in the library. In 2003 the library became the seat of the Vilnius Bookbinders Guild (established in 1664) and the library's bookbinder Cezar Poliakevič was elected as its chairman. In 2005 an information centre "Odysseus" for people with disabilities was opened for the first time in the history of Lithuanian academic libraries. The first Media Collection has been started at the Central Library of Vilnius University in 2006. In 2006 refurbishment of premises of the Central Library was started, In 2006 a technical project for the new library building in Saulėtekis Valley was completed, a concept of the Scholarly Communication and Information Centre was being developed. On 26 March 2009 a tripartite agreement was signed between the Ministry of Education and Science of the Republic of Lithuania, the Central Project Management Centre and Vilnius University on financing and management of new Vilnius University Library building “National Open Access Scholarly Communication and Information Centre” (SCIC). The new building was opened on 6 February 2013 and the SCIC became the first building at the Saulėtekis Science and Technologies Valley.

== Leaders of the library ==
VU Library leaders:

- John Hay (till 1575)
- Laurynas Rydzevskis (1756–1757)
- Stanislovas Rostovskis (1765–1765)
- Juozas Pažovskis (1778–1787)
- Tadeušas Mackievičius (1787–1792)
- Rapolas Litvinskis (1792–1799)
- Augustinas Tomaševskis (1805) – adjunct
- Fransua de la Žumeljė (1807) – adjunct
- Gotfrydas Ernestas Grodekas (1804–1825)
- Liudvikas Sobolevskis (1826–1830)
- Pavelas Kukolnikas (1830–1832)
- Aleksejus Vladimirovas (1866–1869)
- Jakovas Golovackis (1871–1888)
- Julijanas Kračkovskis (1888–1902)
- Flavianas Dobrianskis (1902–1913)
- Dmitrijus Daugėla (1913–1915)
- Eduardas Volteris (1919)
- Stanisław Ptaszycki (1919)
- Ludwik Janowski (1920-1921)
- Witold Nowodworski (1921-1923)
- Stefan Henryk Rygiel (1924–1929)
- Adam Gracjan Łysakowski (1930–1939)
- Vaclovas Biržiška (1940–1941)
- Elena Eimaitytė-Kačinskienė (1941, 1943 – leader at interim)
- Juozas Baldžius (1944–1946)
- Marija Burokienė (1946–1948 – leader at interim)
- Levas Vladimirovas (1948–1964)
- Stasė Vaidinauskaitė-Vaškelienė (1964–1968)
- Jurgis Tornau (1968–1985)
- Birutė Butkevičienė (1985–2006; from September 2006 till September 2008 – director for Science and Cultural Heritage)
- Prof. Audronė Glosienė (General Director from September 2006 till January 2009)
- Irena Krivienė (Director for Economics and Development from September 2006 till March 2009. From March 2009 - Director General)
- dr. Marija Prokopčik (Director of Information and Cultural Heritage Activities from September 2008)
- Jūratė Kuprienė (Director for Economics and Development from January 2010)

== Services ==
The library provides services for the academic community of Vilnius University, all citizens of the Republic of Lithuania and foreign subjects. Academic materials can be borrowed only by members of academic community of Vilnius University, whereas registered users over 16 can borrow fiction and books for leisure. Besides traditional services, the library offers users some unconventional ones such as booking of study spaces or premises, guided tours or 3D printing. The library is supplied with special software for visually and physically impaired. Users can search for resources using virtual library. Study spaces or premises can be booked through internet, with help of which users can browse the library's digital collections, virtual exhibitions, or even take a virtual tour.

== Cultural Heritage ==
The Rare Books Division has accumulated over 170 thousand items from the 15th through the 21st century. It is the largest depository of old books in Lithuania equaling the most famous libraries of Eastern Europe. The library's holdings contain the largest collections of incunabula (328 items, one of the earliest incunabula is Roberto Valturio De re military (Concerning Military Matters, Verona, 1472), one of the largest collections of post-incunabula (around 1.7 thousand items) in Lithuania and the richest in the world collection of early printed Lithuanian books (including the first printed Lithuanian book by Martynas Mažvydas, Katekizmas by Mikalojus Daukša, works by Baltramiejus Vilentas); especially valuable old atlases (1.2 thousand items) and maps (around 10 thousand items); book collection of the Old Vilnius University Library – Bibliotheca Academiae Vilnensis (it includes books from collections of Sigismund August, Sapieha family, Georg Albinius, Walerian Protasewicz, Michał Kazimierz Pac, Eustachy Wołowicz, university professors and eminent figures of Lithuania).[3]

The Manuscripts Division contains more than 325 thousand items in various languages of the world as well as autographs by eminent scholars and cultural figures of Lithuania and the world, members of royal families and rulers of the Grand Duchy of Lithuania. The major part of materials is related to Vilnius University and its history. The division contains personal archives of former and current professors and researchers of the university, collection of dissertations and final papers, materials collected in ethnographic and local history investigation expeditions, archives of societies and associations, special collections (parchments, photographs, music sheets, architectural drawings and blueprints, land layouts, autographs, collection of newspapers from 1988 to 1993 National Renaissance Periodicals.

The Division of Graphic Arts has around 92 thousand items in its collection. The most significant part of the collection (around 12 thousand prints) covering the period from the 16th to the 19th century.

== Architecture of historical halls ==
=== Hall of Franciszek Smuglewicz ===
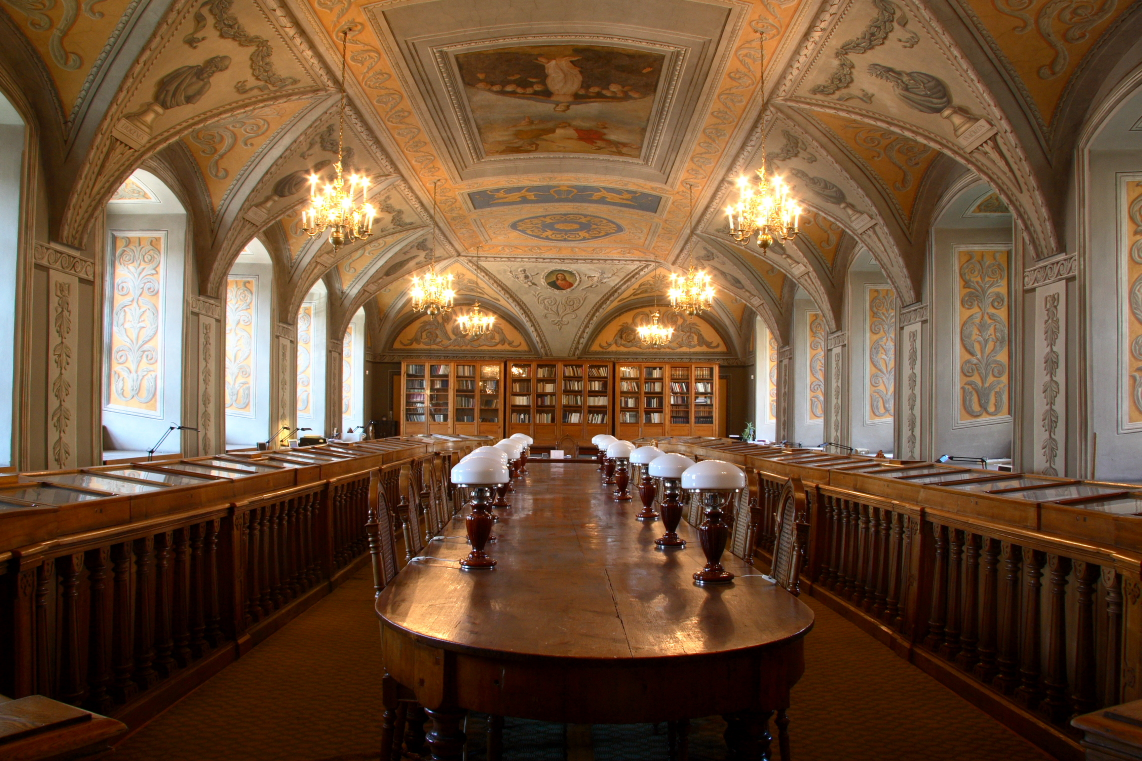
Hall of Franciszek Smuglewicz

The Hall of Franciszek Smuglewicz is the oldest part of the original library complex, named after Franciszek Smuglewicz (1745–1807), celebrated painter and professor of the university. Until the end of the 18th century, the hall was used as a refectory. In 1803 it was assigned to the library and artist Smuglewicz was hired to decorate it. The painter adhered to the spirit of Classicism; between the windows and on the walls he painted the portraits of the 12 most prominent figures in antique art and science: Socrates, Plutarch, Pindar, Anacreon, Hesiod, Heraclitus, Aristotle, Euripides, Diogenes, Homer, Archimedes and Plato. From then on the hall was used for various ceremonies and celebrations. Adam Mickiewicz was granted his diploma here in 1819. Prominent guests including Napoleon, Tsar Alexander II, and others have visited this hall.

In 1855 the hall was assigned to the Antiquities Museum of the Vilnius Provisional Archaeology Commission and, when the commission was closed in 1865, to the Public Library of Vilnius. Over time hall's functions changed and in 1867 painter Vasilii Griaznov replaced its classical tones with pseudo-Byzantine ornamentation. The hall was refurbished in 1929 and restored to the version by Smuglewicz. During the works, a 16th– or 17th-century fresco of Mary enveloping the founders of the old university was uncovered on the ceiling. Since then the Hall of Franciszek Smuglewicz has retained its appearance with furniture from the time of the Public Library of Vilnius.

=== Hall of Joachim Lelewel ===
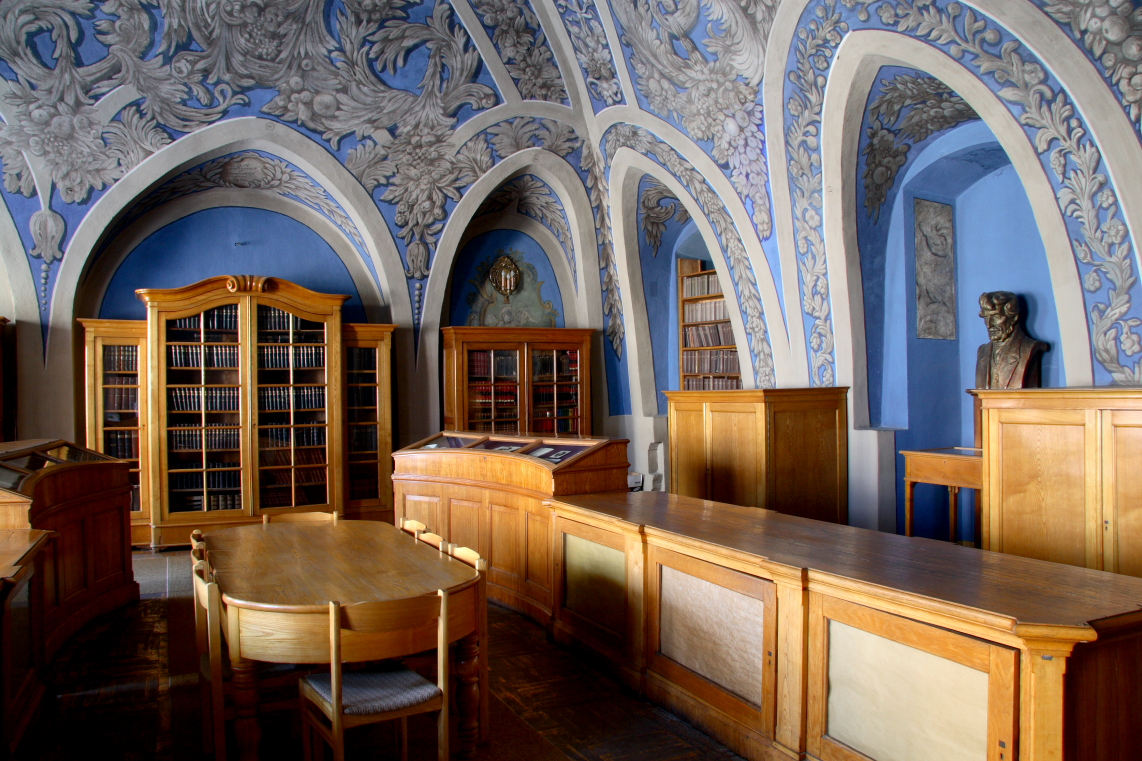
Hall of Joachim Lelewel

At first the hall was an almost square chapel with a vaulted ceiling, rising upwards through the second and third floors. The centre of the vaults was taken up by a panel with a painted portrait of St. Stanislaus Kostka, the guardian of students. The chapel was built at the end of the 17th century according to designs of Tomasz Zebrowski. After the dissolution of the Jesuit Order the hall was used by the Department of Paintings. The hall was divided into two floors during the first quarter of the 19th century. For a long time the third floor was home to the Art Department, and the workplace of famous artist Jan Rustem. In 1929, professor Joachim Lelewel bequeathed a valuable collection of books and atlases to the library; they were transferred from Kurniki to this hall, which was then named in his honour and commemorative exhibition was arranged.

=== White Hall (old observatory) ===
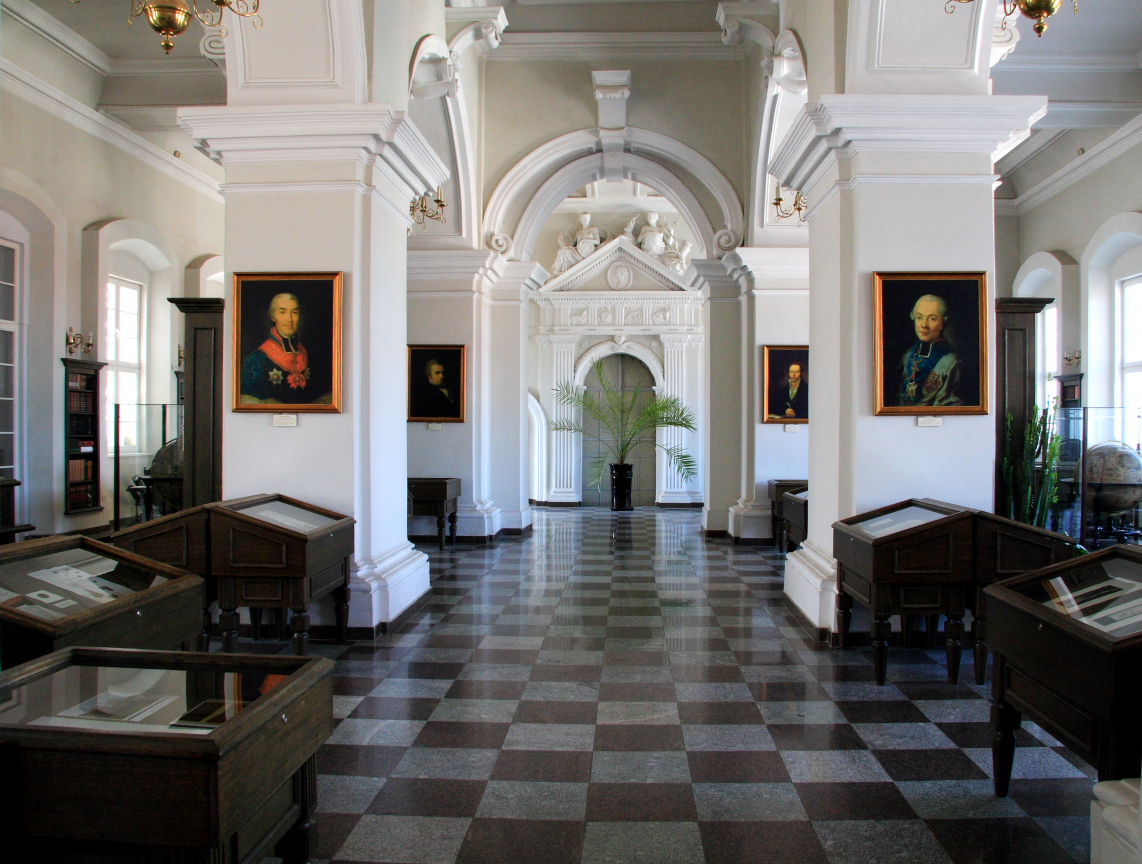
The White Hall

The history of the White Hall is part of the history of the old observatory (founded in 1753) of the Vilnius University. The observatory was designed and built by Lithuanian architect and astronomer, VU professor, Tomasz Zebrowski. Funds for the building were donated by Ignacy Ogiński and his daughter Elżbieta Ogińska-Puzynina, whose particularly generous contribution of 200,000 Polish złoty gained her the title of the observatory patron.

The observatory was composed of the White Hall, the Small Hall, two slender three-storey square towers, and two small single-storey towers. Six massive Baroque pillars, girded with ornamental cornices divide the White Hall into three parts. An oval opening in ceiling appears to connect the White Hall with the Small Hall above it, and thereby conveys the Baroque concept of infinite space. A remarkable portrait of King Stanisław August Poniatowski is positioned in the centre of the tympanum. The portrait is surmounted by allegorical figures of the sitting women representing Diana and Urania. Diana holds a portrait of benefactress Elżbieta Ogińska-Puzynina, while Uriana has a wreath of stars in her hands.

At the end of the 18th century, Marcin Odlanicki Poczobutt built an extension to the observatory, designed by architect Marcin Knackfus in the Classical style. The extension housed a large quadrant and other instruments. The White Hall contained not only astronomical equipment but also a valuable library with works on astronomy, mathematics, physics, geography, architecture, and other subjects taught at the university. The books were kept in 12 cupboards in niches between the windows. The hall was decorated with approximately 30 oil paintings of prominent individuals and university scholars. The observatory was seriously damaged by fire in 1876 and closed in 1883. During the time of the Public Library of Vilnius, the White Hall was used as a book depository. It was reopened in 1997 after 10-year renovation. A unique collection of ancient astronomical instruments, including globes made in Amsterdam in 1622 as well as globes made in 1750 and dedicated to King Stanisław August Poniatowski, is displayed in the White Hall. Now it houses the Professor's Reading Room and plans are made to arrange a museum of the university's history.

=== Philology Reading Room ===
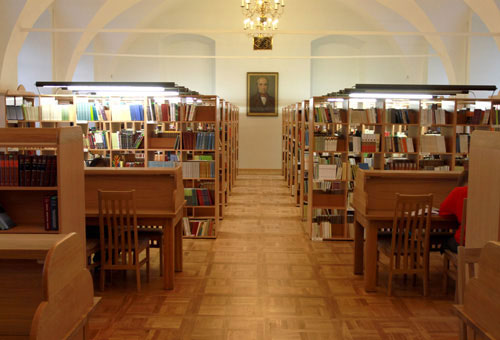
Philology reading room

The Philology Room occupies the second floor above the Hall of Franciszek Smuglewicz. At first the room was the assembly hall of the Jesuit Academy, later it was converted into a library. When the library was transferred to the present Small Aula in 1819, the room housed a museum of mineralogy. After the university was closed, the hall belonged to the Museum of Antiquities from 1855 to 1865. In 1945, the hall was converted into the General Reading Room for the Vilnius University Library. The hall has once again been newly restored, according to a project by architect Aldona Švabauskienė. The parquet floor was restored according to the surviving samples from the mid-19th century. The 17th-century vaults have been preserved, but their decorations of plaster-work were painted over at the beginning of the 20th century, and now the room is devoid of embellishments. In the end of 2010 the hall was converted into the Philology Reading Room.

=== Professors' Reading Room ===
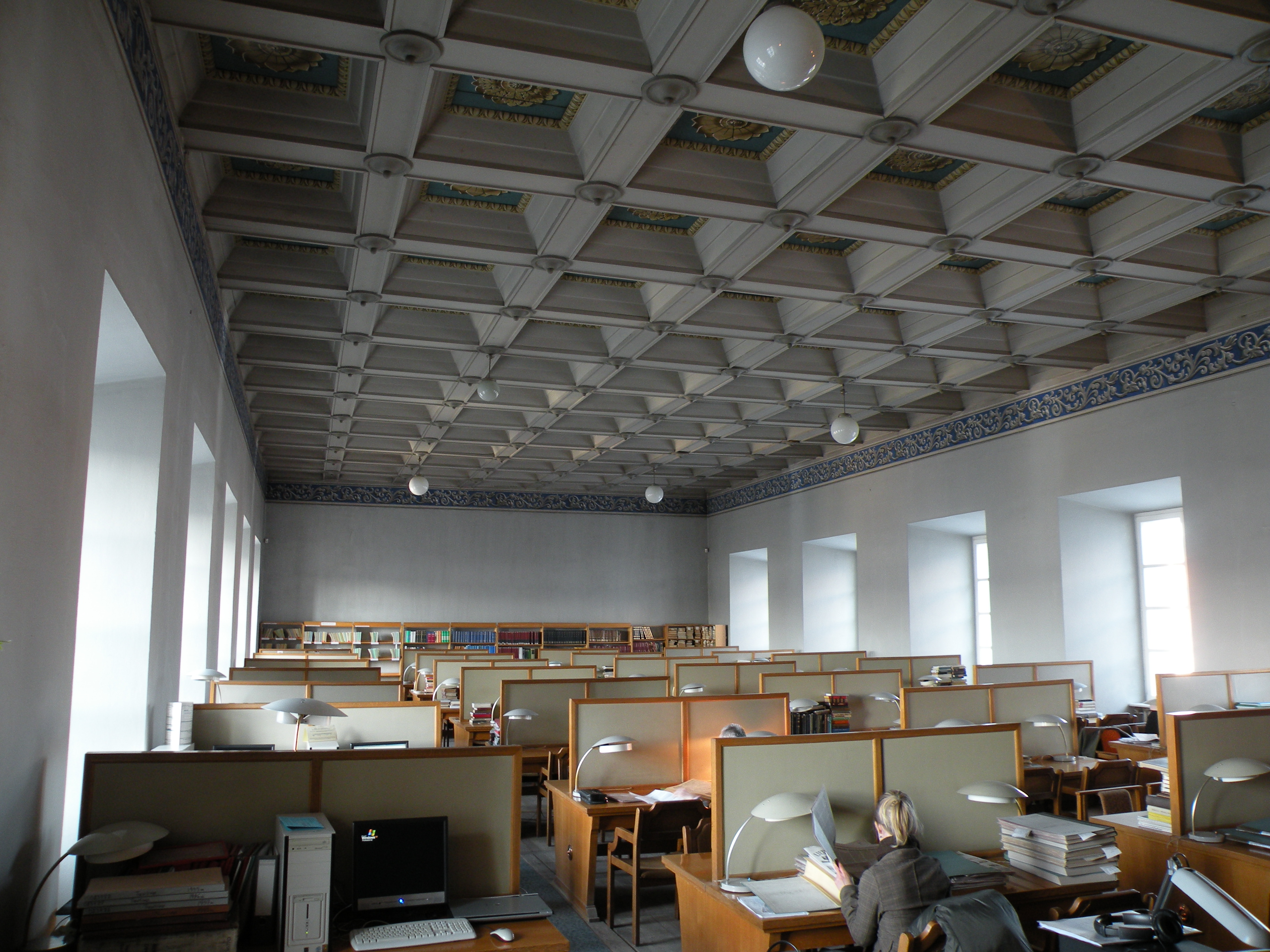
The Professors' Reading Room

The hall used to serve as the Jesuits' summer residence. In the 18th century it was decided to adapt the hall to the needs of the library. A frieze with floral ornaments was discovered under a layer of plaster during a restoration in 1919. The design of its wooden coffered ceiling by architect Karol Podczaszyński was discovered after a fire in 1969. It was renovated by Ferdynand Ruszczyc, a professor of the university. The hall's Classical decor and its original grey colour was restored in 1970.

== National Open Access Scientific Communication and Information Center ==
National Open Access Scientific Communication and Information Center

The Scholarly Communication and Information Centre (SCIC) is a subdivision of Vilnius University Library situated in the Saulėtekis Science and Technologies Valley. Four faculties, two centres, namely Centre for Physical Sciences and Technology, and Life Sciences Centre as well as other institutions are located in the Valley. Distinguishing itself by modern environment, SCIC works 24 hours a day and 7 days a week providing around 800 study spaces. Users are offered with special reading rooms, rooms for individual or group work, seminar rooms, a conference hall equipped with modern technologies, a playroom designated for children, 3D printer, special laboratories supplied with assistive technologies for visually impaired. Relaxation zones and a café also serve the needs of users.

The most advanced technologies are applied for the library's maintenance and book transportation systems. Underground storage and technical floors have modern book transportation, security and fire extinguisher with mist spray systems. The library's building was designed by Rolandas Palekas, a winner of the Lithuania National Award. In 2013 the Ministry of the Environment acknowledged the Scholarly Communication and Information Centre one of the best architectural creations in the field of urbanistic and architecture.

== See also ==
- List of libraries in Lithuania
