= Nicolas Fuss =

Swiss mathematician (1755–1826)

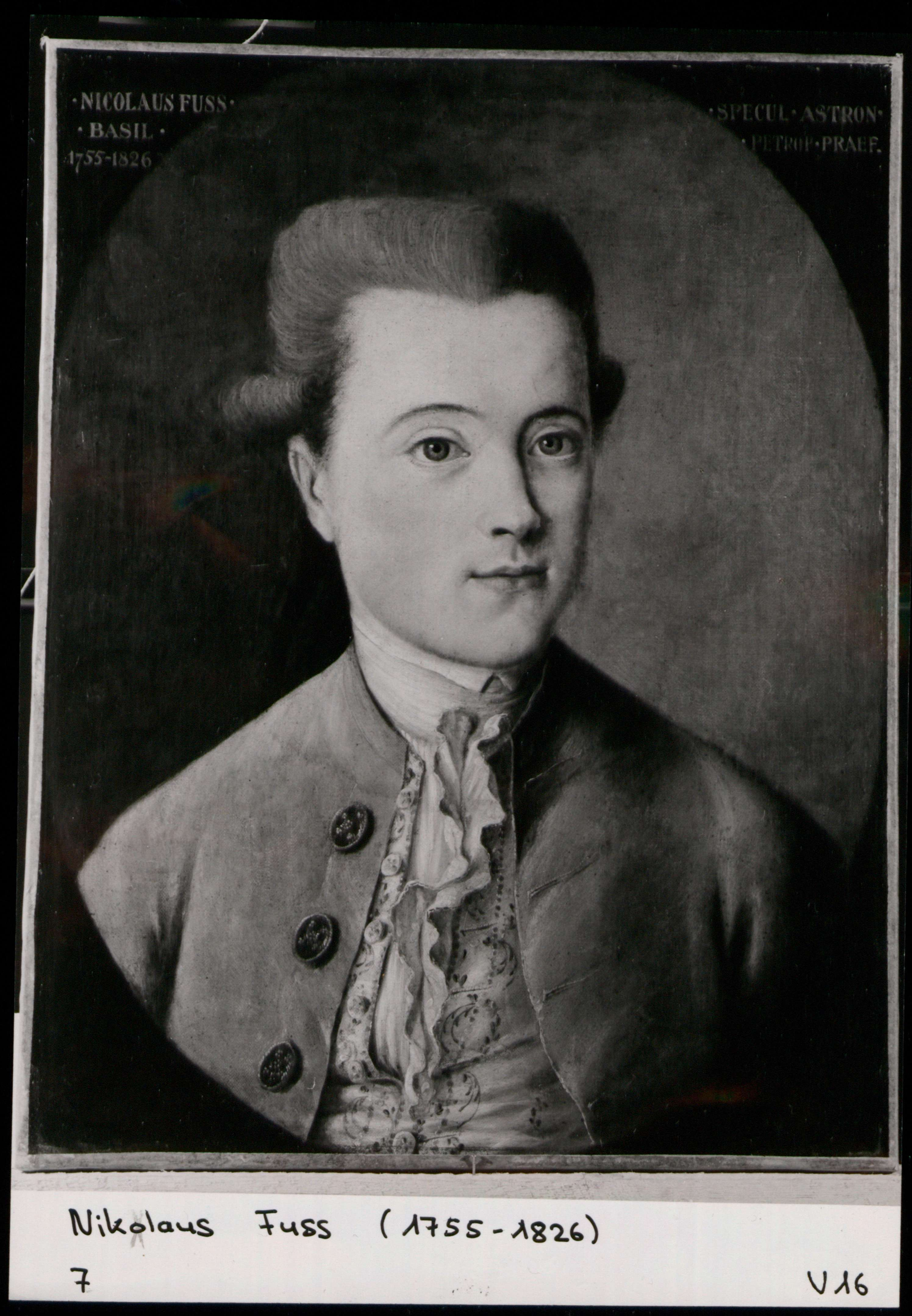
- Born: 29 January 1755; Basel, Switzerland
- Died: 4 January 1826 (aged 70); Saint Petersburg, Russia
- Scientific career
- Fields: Mathematics
- Academic advisors: Leonhard Euler

Nicolas Fuss (29 January 1755 – 4 January 1826), also known as Nikolai Fuss, was a Swiss mathematician, living most of his life in Russia.

== Biography ==
Fuss was born in Basel, Switzerland. He moved to Saint Petersburg to serve as a mathematical assistant to Leonhard Euler from 1773–1783, and remained there until his death. He contributed to spherical trigonometry, differential equations, the optics of microscopes and telescopes, differential geometry, and actuarial science. He also contributed to Euclidean geometry, including the problem of Apollonius.

In 1797, he was elected a foreign member of the Royal Swedish Academy of Sciences. From 1800 to 1826, Fuss served as the permanent secretary to the Imperial Academy of Sciences in Saint Petersburg. He was elected as a foreign honorary member of the American Academy of Arts and Sciences in 1812. He died in Saint Petersburg.

== Family ==
Nicolas Fuss was married to Albertine Benedikte Philippine Luise Euler (1766–1822). Albertine Euler was the daughter of Leonhard Euler's eldest son, Johann Albrecht Euler (1734–1800), and his wife, Anna Sophie Charlotte Hagemeister. Pauline Fuss, a daughter of Nicolas and Albertine, married the Russian chemist Genrikh Struve. Nicolas's son, Paul Heinrich Fuss (1798–1855), edited the first attempt at a collected works of Euler. Paul Heinrich was a member of the Imperial Academy of Sciences in Saint Petersburg from 1823 and its secretary from 1826. Nicolas's son, Georg Albert (1806–1854), was from 1839 an astronomer in Pulkovo and then from 1848 in Vilnius; he also published on magnetism.

== See also ==
- Catenary
- Fuss' theorem for bicentric quadrilaterals
- Fuss–Catalan number
- Fuss Peak, a volcano in the Kuril Islands

== Sources ==
- Rudolf Mumenthaler: "Fuss, Niklaus" in German, French and Italian in the online Historical Dictionary of Switzerland., 2006
- Kurt-R. Biermann (1961). "Fuß, Nikolaus". Neue Deutsche Biographie (in German). Vol. 5. Berlin: Duncker & Humblot. pp. 742–743. (full text online).
