= Kosmos (magazine) =

Lithuanian science magazine (1920–1940)

- Former editors: Pranas Dovydaitis
- Frequency: Monthly
- Publisher: Šviesa
- First issue: 20 October 1920
- Final issue: 1940
- Country: Lithuania
- Based in: Kaunas
- Language: Lithuanian

Kosmos was a Lithuanian-language magazine published from 1920 to 1940 in Kaunas. Published and edited by Pranas Dovydaitis, it was the first Lithuanian periodical devoted to natural sciences.

== History ==
The first issue was published on 20 October 1920. Most of the articles in the first issue were written by the chief editor Pranas Dovydaitis. He published the first three issues at his own expense. It was later supported by the Society of Saint Casimir and the Ministry of Education. However, after the coup d'état in December 1926, it lost government support and struggled financially.

Kosmos was published irregularly until 1925, and monthly in 1926–1929. In 1930, seven issues were published. In 1931–1940, the magazine published three or four issues per year. In total, 97 issues were published.

It also published a youth supplement Gamtos draugas from 1929 to 1937. The journal was printed by the Šviesa printing house. The magazine was discontinued after the Soviet occupation of Lithuania in June 1940.

== Content ==
Articles in Kosmos covered a wide range of science fields – astronomy, botany, chemistry, geography, geology, hydrology, climatology, mathematics, and others. Additionally, the publication provided a chronicle of global scientific discoveries and news, book reviews, and bibliographies. The journal popularized natural sciences, contributed to their development, and sought to emulate similar Western periodicals. The quality of articles steadily improved. It started publishing informational and translated articles, and later grew to publish mainly original studies.

Several issues were devoted to a single topic, such as microbiologist Louis Pasteur (November–December 1926), evolution (October–November 1929), hydrology and the 10th anniversary of the Lithuanian Hydrometric Bureau (July and December 1932).

== Contributors ==
Nearly all professors of the Mathematics and Natural Science Faculty of the Vytautas Magnus University contributed articles to the magazine. Article authors included Konradas Aleksa, Petras Avižonis, Pranciškus Būčys, Vincas Čepinskis, Jurgis Elisonas, Tadas Ivanauskas, Antanas Juška, Bernardas Kodatis, Steponas Kolupaila, Povilas Matulionis, Antanas Minkevičius, Kazys Pakštas, Česlovas Pakuckas, Aleksandras Račkus, Paulius Slavėnas, Kazys Sleževičius, Pranciškus Baltrus Šivickis, and Genrikas Zimanas.

The magazine published several theses, including the 1939 dissertation on the histological study of the regeneration of Planaria lugubris by Antanina Prielgauskienė, the first woman to receive a doctorate at Vytautas Magnus University.
