= 67 Ophiuchi =

Star in the constellation Ophiuchus

- Location of 67 Ophiuchi (circled)

Observation data Epoch J2000 Equinox ICRS
- Constellation: Ophiuchus
- Right ascension: 18^{h} 00^{m} 38.71619^{s}
- Declination: +02° 55′ 53.6324″
- Apparent magnitude (V): 3.93

Characteristics
- Spectral type: B5Ib
- U−B color index: −0.62
- B−V color index: +0.03

Astrometry
Radial velocity (R_{v})	−5.20 km/s
Proper motion (μ)	RA: +1.15 mas/yr Dec.: −9.35 mas/yr
Parallax (π)	2.65±0.54 mas
Distance	2,020±200 ly (620±60 pc)
Absolute magnitude (M_{V})	−3.5

Details
Mass	12.6±0.4 M_{☉}
Radius	31±4 R_{☉}
Luminosity	39,800+9,200 −7,500 L_{☉}
Surface gravity (log g)	3.03 cgs
Temperature	14,700±300 K
Metallicity [Fe/H]	−0.01 dex
Rotational velocity (v sin i)	40 km/s
Age	16.6+1.6 −1.5 Myr

Other designations
- BD+02°3458, CCDM J18007+0256A, FK5 677, GC 24509, HIP 88192, HR 6714, HD 164353, SAO 123013, WDS J18006+0256A

Database references
SIMBAD	data

67 Ophiuchi (67 Oph) is a class B5 Ib (blue supergiant) star in the constellation Ophiuchus. Its apparent magnitude is 3.93 and it is approximately 2,000 light years away based on spectroscopy. It is considered to be a member of the open cluster Collinder 359 (Melotte 186).

67 Oph has four companions. The closest is a magnitude 13.7 B1 main sequence star at 8.29", designated B. Component C (BD+02°3459) is the brightest close companion, a magnitude 8.1 B2 main sequence star at 54.32". Component D is a magnitude 12.5 star 8.37" from component C. Component E is a magnitude 10.9 star 46.53" from 67 Oph A.

This star was once considered part of the obsolete constellation Taurus Poniatovii, but after the International Astronomical Union officially recognized constellations, it was placed in Ophiuchus.
