= Jakub Nakcjanowicz =

Jakub Nakcjanowicz or Nakcyanowicz (Lithuanian: Jokūbas Nakcijonavičius; 1 May 1725 – 1777) was a Jesuit priest, mathematician, and astronomer of the Polish–Lithuanian Commonwealth. He was the second director of the Vilnius University Astronomical Observatory (1758–1764).

== Biography ==
Jakob Nakcyanowicz was born on 1 May 1725 in Grodno, present-day Belarus. He joined the Jesuits in 1742. From 1744 to 1746 he taught in present-day Ilūkste. From 1746 to 1749 Nakcyanowicz studied philosophy at the Jesuit College in Polotsk. He returned to lecture in Ilūkste from 1749 to 1750. From 1750 to 1751 he lectured syntax and grammar in Pašiaušė. From 1751 to 1755 he studied theology at Vilnius University. He was ordained as a priest in 1754. Nakcyanowicz was prefect of the Diocesan Seminary in Vilnius. Nakcyanowicz once again returned to Ilūkste to lecture on mathematics from 1754 to 1758. In 1758 he became the director of the Vilnius University Astronomical Observatory, a position preceded by the observatory's founder Thomas Zebrowski, holding that title until 1764. Nakcyanowicz was Zebrowski's student. In the university itself, Nakcyanowicz lectured on mathematics, geodesics, philosophy, and experimental physics. From 1764 he taught at various schools at Grodno. From 1766 to 1768 he taught mathematics at Navahrudak. In 1773 he was dean of the faculty of philosophy of Vilnius University.

As a scientist, Nakcyanowicz was mostly interested in the works of Christian Wolff. Nakcyanowicz developed a mathematics textbook entitled Exercitationes in analysi cum finitorum tum infinitorum mathematicae, which was published in 1758. The textbook concerned the binomial theorem, progressions, geometry, and trigonometry. He wrote another textbook entitled Praelectiones mathematicae ex Wolfianis elementis adornatae in 1759–1761, which concerned the basic principles of mathematics, arithmetic, geometry, trigonometry, and some algebra. In 1762 published a work on conic sections and other algebraic and transcendental curves.
