= Georg Thomas Sabler =

Baltic German astronomer (1810–1865)

- Born: Georg Thomas Sabler; 30 April [O.S. 18 April] 1810; Haljala, Russian Empire
- Died: December 7, 1865 (aged 55); Vilnius, Russian Empire
- Education: University of Tartu (doctorate)
- Known for: Sunspot photography Achromatic lenses
- Spouse(s): Charlotte Knüpffer; Sophie Knüpffer
- Scientific career
- Fields: Astronomy
- Workplaces: Tartu Observatory; Pulkovo Observatory; Vilnius University Astronomical Observatory
- Doctoral advisor: Friedrich Georg Wilhelm von Struve

Georg Thomas Sabler (Russian: Его́р Его́рович Са́блер or Георг Заблер, Lithuanian: Georgas Tomas Sableris; 30 April [O.S. 18 April] 1810 – 7 December 1865) was an astronomer and geodesist of Baltic German origin active in territories of modern-day Estonia, Lithuania, Ukraine, and Russia (then all part of the Russian Empire).

A student of Friedrich Georg Wilhelm von Struve, Sabler studied theology and mathematics at the University of Tartu. Fascinated by Struve's lectures of astronomy, Sabler participated in an expedition that measured the difference of sea levels in the Black Sea and Caspian Sea. Sabler then worked as an astronomer at Tartu Observatory and Pulkovo Observatory, and later became the director of the Vilnius University Astronomical Observatory, which received its own photoheliograph due to Sabler's efforts. The telescope was the second one produced in the world. Sabler and his assistant Matvey Gusev pioneered the photography and research of sunspots.

He was described as the "creator and pioneer of new astrophysical research at the Vilnius observatory". Sabler also constructed a star catalog, took care of the methodology of observations, and constructed various astronomical instruments such as achromatic lenses. Notably, Sabler participated in determining the Struve Geodetic Arc in Finland, Lithuania, Ukraine, and Bessarabia. Sabler was the first to find a way to determine the angle of refraction in transparent media.

== Biography ==
=== Early life and studies ===
Georg Thomas Sabler was born on 30 April [O.S. 18 April] 1810 in Haljala, now part of Lääne-Viru County, Estonia. His father, Georg Christian Sabler (1776–1819), was a Lutheran pastor. At first, Sabler studied privately. Later, Sabler graduated from the Tartu Evangelical Cathedral's gymnasium. Sabler studied theology (1828–1832) and mathematics (1832–1839) at the University of Tartu. He developed an interest in natural sciences, especially in astronomy, which was lectured by Friedrich Georg Wilhelm von Struve. During his study years, Sabler was engaged in astronomical observations, particularly of binary stars. Some of his works were published in the scientific press. For his scientific aptitude, von Struve ensured that Sabler began working at the Tartu Observatory as an assistant to its director until 1839.

In 1836–1837 Sabler participated in an expedition that determined the difference between the sea levels of the Black Sea and Caspian Sea. He also edited the material collected during the expedition and published it in German under the title "Beschreibung der zur Ermittelung des Höhenunterschiedes zwischen dem Schwarzen und dem Caspischen Meere... in den Jahren 1836 und 1837 von Gr. Fuss, A. Sawitsch und G. Sabler ausgeführten Messungen... zusammengestellt von G. Sabler. Im Auftrage der Akademie herausgegeben von W. Struve". For his work, which he wrote about in 1839, he received a doctoral degree, and subsequently graduated that same year.

=== Astronomer ===
From 1839 to 1854 Sabler worked as an assistant and senior astronomer at the Pulkovo Observatory near St. Petersburg, where Struve was the director. Actively partaking in astronomical research, Sabler was then assigned the task of measuring the exact coordinates of stars using a large meridian circle. From 1844 to 1853, Sabler and Carl Friedrich Tenner participated in the construction of the Struve Geodetic Arc in modern-day Finland, Bessarabia, and Ukraine. In Ukraine, specifically the Khotynsky district, the scientists chose the prevailing heights of the area, which were located near the villages of Romankivtsi, Shebutyntsi, Selishche, and Hrubno. Sabler lived in Romankivtsi for more than a week. The results of the research were published in the bulletin of the Imperial Russian Geographical Society, the journal of the Ministry of National Education, and others.

Sabler also participated in measuring the longitude difference between the Pulkovo Observatory and Altona Observatory. In his free time, Sabler polished lenses, successfully making quality achromatic lenses using two glasses of crown glass between which lay a transparent liquid with the appropriate refractive and light scattering coefficients. The lenses were described in the St. Petersburg Academy of Sciences's newsletter. One of Sabler's prism lenses has survived to this day and is an exhibition in the Vilnius University Science Museum.

=== Activity in Vilnius ===
After coming to Vilnius, Sabler determined the geographical position of one of the points used for measuring the Struve Geodetic Arc near the village of Nemėžis. From 1854 to 1865, Sabler was director of the Vilnius University Astronomical Observatory. Sabler sent his assistant and fellow astronomer Matvey Gusev for an internship to England in 1858–1860, where they learned of the appliance of photography in astronomy in Kew Observatory, famously pioneered by astronomer Warren De la Rue. On 19 April 1861, Sabler participated in a meeting hosted by the St. Petersburg Academy of Sciences' physics and mathematics department in Pulkovo. In the meeting, Sabler argued that the university's observatory required a solar telescope, emphasizing that the observatory should direct all efforts for astrophysics research of sunspots and star photometry instead of traditional astrometry.

In 1862–1864, while in Great Britain, Sabler observed the development of the solar telescope. He successfully ordered one of the solar telescopes after negotiations with John Henry Dallmeyer and permission from Struve. In 1864, the Vilnius observatory successfully received its own solar telescope and produced one of the first pictures of sunspots. The telescope would be destroyed in a fire in 1876. Sabler used a method of coating the photographic plate with collodion, which was a method invented in 1850. Firstly, the glass would be filled with a nitrocellulose solution enriched with iodides and bromides and dried. Before photographing, the plate would be further sensitized by dipping it in a solution of silver nitrate and silver iodide. The prepared photographic plate had to be exposed for 10 or 15 minutes and developed immediately.

The establishment of a new solar telescope meant a reconstruction of the observatory's towers. However, as Sabler became increasingly sick, he made Gusev responsible for the continuation of his works. Sabler traveled to St. Petersburg for treatment, after which he became less ill, but only for a short time. In autumn of 1865 the illness, which was a brain tumor, began to rapidly progress. Sabler's scientific work continued to be worked upon in the observatory by Gusev and Pyotr Smyslov.

=== Death ===
Sabler died on 7 December 1865 in Vilnius. He was buried in the Vilnius Evangelical Lutheran Cemetery. The grave was destroyed during the Soviet occupation of Lithuania.

== Remembrance ==
A commemorative plaque was uncovered in his home village of Haljala on 24 June 1991.
