= Taurus Poniatovii =

Former constellation

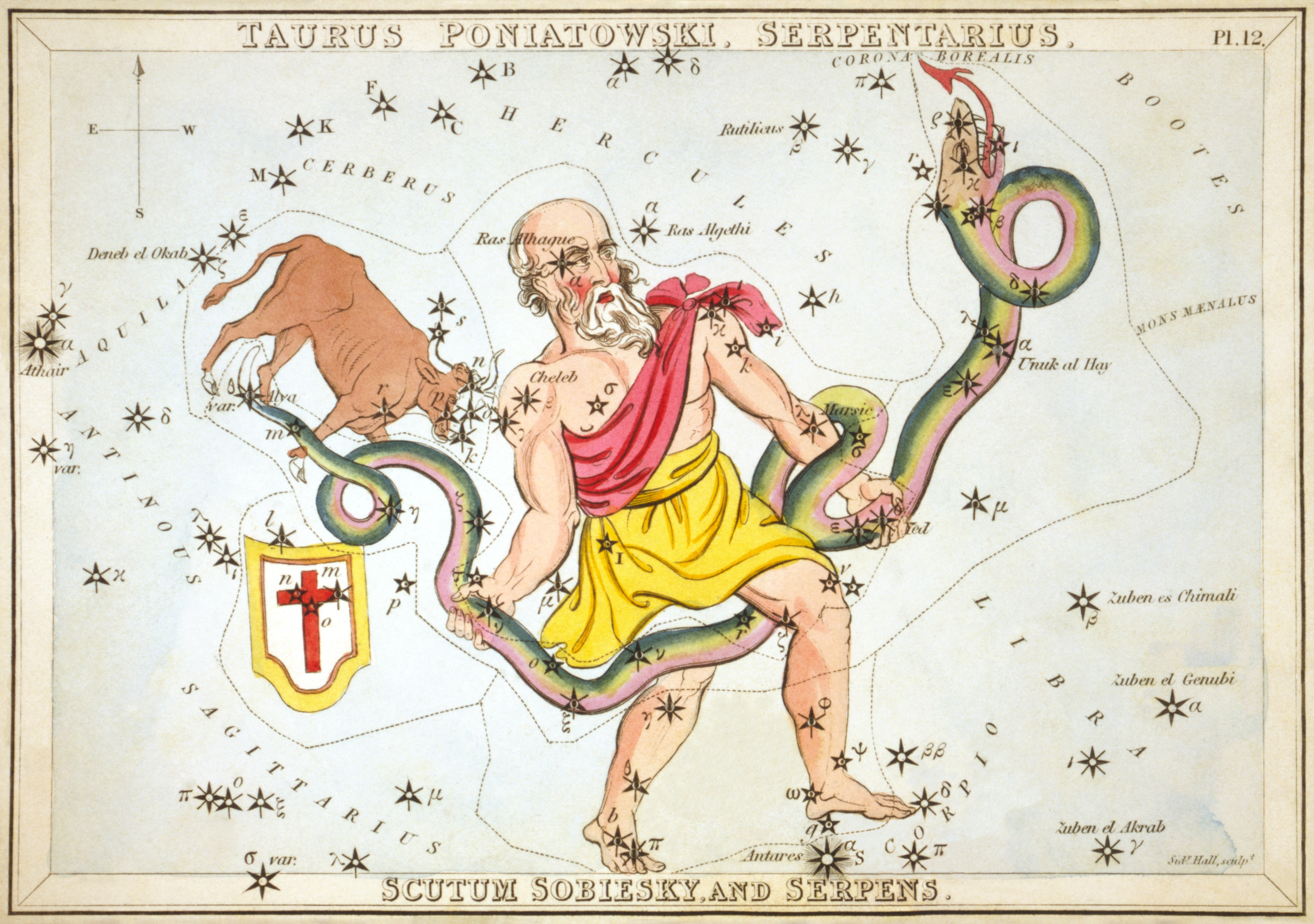
Ophiuchus holding the serpent, Serpens, as depicted on a constellation card published in London around 1825. Above the tail of the serpent is the Taurus Poniatovii while below it is Scutum.

Taurus Poniatovii (Latin for Poniatowski's bull) was a constellation created by the former rector of Vilnius University, Marcin Odlanicki Poczobutt, in 1777 to honor Stanislaus Poniatowski, King of Poland and Grand Duke of Lithuania. It consisted of stars that are today considered part of Ophiuchus and Aquila. It is no longer in use. It was wedged in between Ophiuchus, Aquila and Serpens Cauda. A depiction of the constellation can be found on the wall of the Vilnius University Astronomical Observatory.

== The stars ==
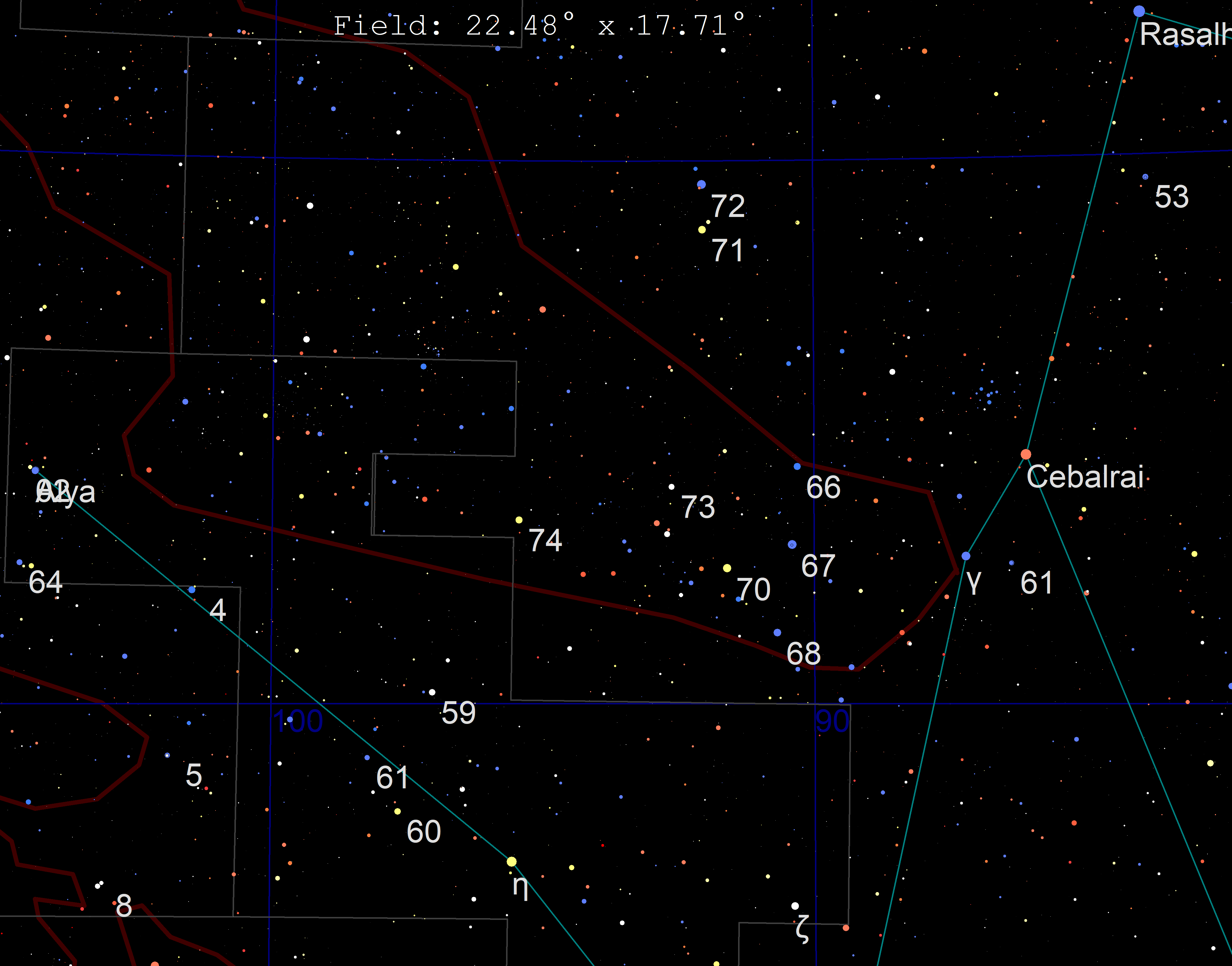
The stars of Taurus Poniatovii in northeastern parts of Ophiuchus

Ciołek coat of arms of the Poniatowski family

The stars were picked for the resemblance of their arrangement to the Hyades group which form the "head" of Taurus. Before the definition of Taurus Poniatovii, some of these had been part of the obsolete constellation River Tigris. The brightest of these stars is 72 Oph (3.7 magnitude) in the "horn" of Taurus Poniatovii. The "face" of Taurus Poniatovii is formed by 67 Oph (4.0), 68 Oph (4.4) and 70 Oph (4.0). The five brightest stars belong to loose open cluster Collinder 359 or Melotte 186. Barnard's Star is also inside the boundaries of this former constellation. Some minor stars (5th and 6th magnitude) now in Aquila formed the "rear" of Taurus Poniatovii.

== See also ==
- Former constellations
- List of stars in Ophiuchus
- Scutum, a constellation created in 1684 by Polish astronomer Johannes Hevelius (Jan Heweliusz), to commemorate the victory of the Polish forces led by King John III Sobieski in the Battle of Vienna.
