= Michał Hłuszniewicz =

Russian astronomer (1797–1862)

Michał Hłuszniewicz (Russian: Михаил Осипович Глушневич, Lithuanian: Mykolas Hlusnevičius; 1797 – 21 July 1862) was an astronomer of the Russian Empire who was the sixth director of the Vilnius University Astronomical Observatory (1843–1848).

== Biography ==
Michał Hłuszniewicz was born in 1797 in Minsk. His brother Antoni Hłuszniewicz was a doctor and émigré activist. Their father ran a private boys' school in the city. After graduating from a gymnasium in Minsk, Hłuszniewicz studied mathematics at Vilnius University from 1814 to 1818. He achieved his magister degree in philosophy in 1818. Among his teachers was Jan Śniadecki.

In 1819 he became an adjunct professor, and later assistant to Piotr Sławinski, the director of the Vilnius University Astronomical Observatory. Hłuszniewicz succeeded Sławinski as the observatory's director in 1843, holding the title until 1848. Hłuszniewicz participated in Carl Friedrich Tenner's triangulation of Lithuania and other surrounding areas for which he was awarded the Order of Saint Stanislaus with a ring. As an astronomer, Hłuszniewicz observed planets, occultation of the Moon, eclipses of Jupiter's moons, and asteroids. He also continued publishing the observatory's magazine (called Extrait des observations faites à l’observatoire de l’Académie Impériale des Sciences à Vilna), which was established during Sławinski's time. Observations were also published in Astronomische Nachrichten.

Hłuszniewicz lived modestly and gave much of his wealth to the poor. He belonged to the Society for the Support of Poor University Students. He kept about a tenth of his pension for himself and gave the rest to poor widows and orphans.

Hłuszniewicz died on 21 July 1862 in Vilnius. He was buried near the city's Church of St. Stephen.
