= Fuss Peak =

Volcano in the Kuril Islands of Russia

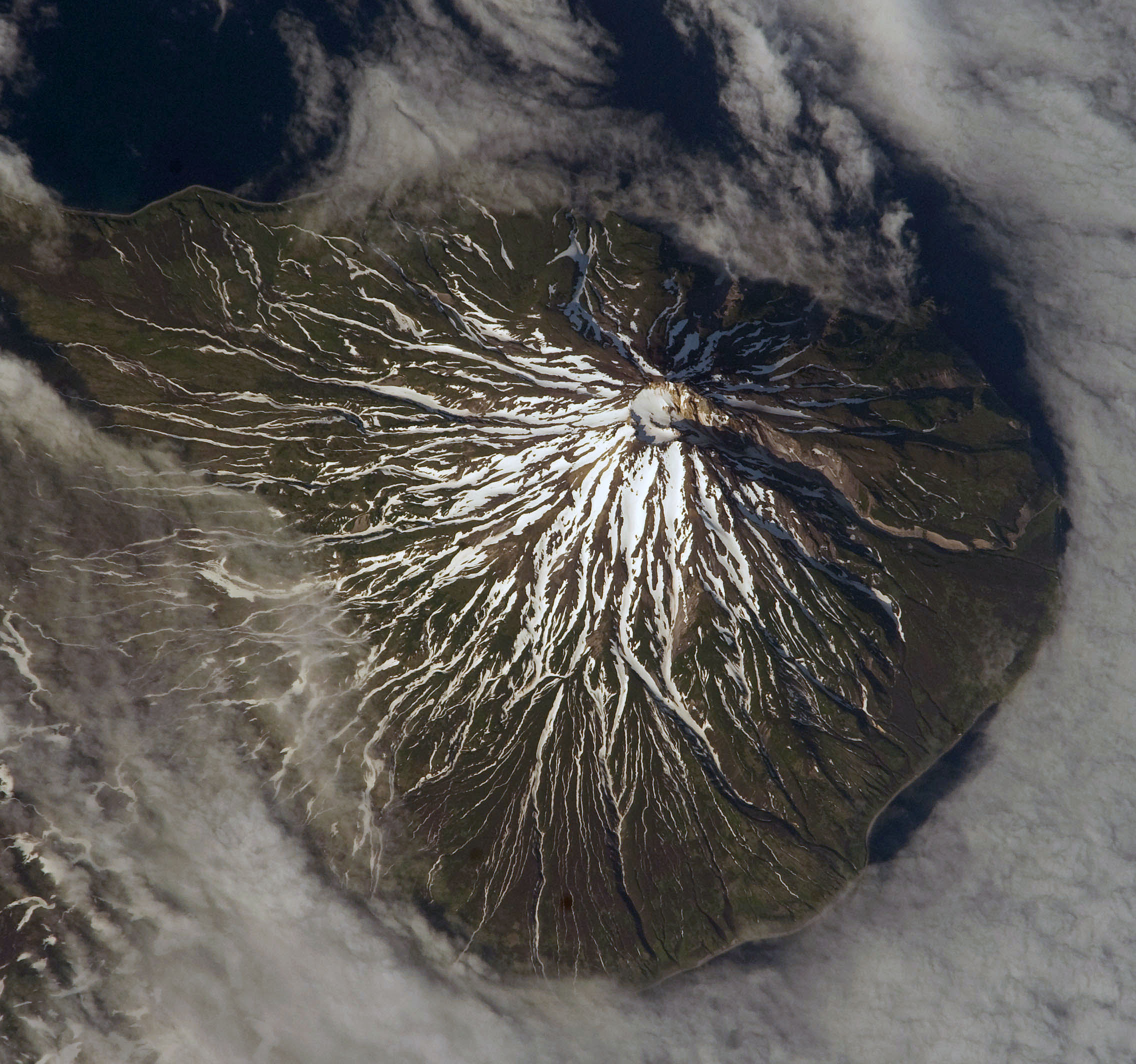
- Fuss Peak from ISS.

Highest point
- Elevation: 1,772 m (5,814 ft)
- Prominence: 1,630 m (5,350 ft)
- Listing: Ultra, Ribu
- Coordinates: 50°16′03″N 155°14′51″E

Geography
- Location within Russia
- Location: Paramushir, Kuril Islands, Russia

Geology
- Mountain type: Stratovolcano
- Last eruption: July 1854

Fuss Peak (Russian: Вулкан Фусса; Japanese: 後鏃岳; Shiriyajiri-dake) is an active stratovolcano located on the southwest coast of Paramushir Island, Kuril Islands, Russia.

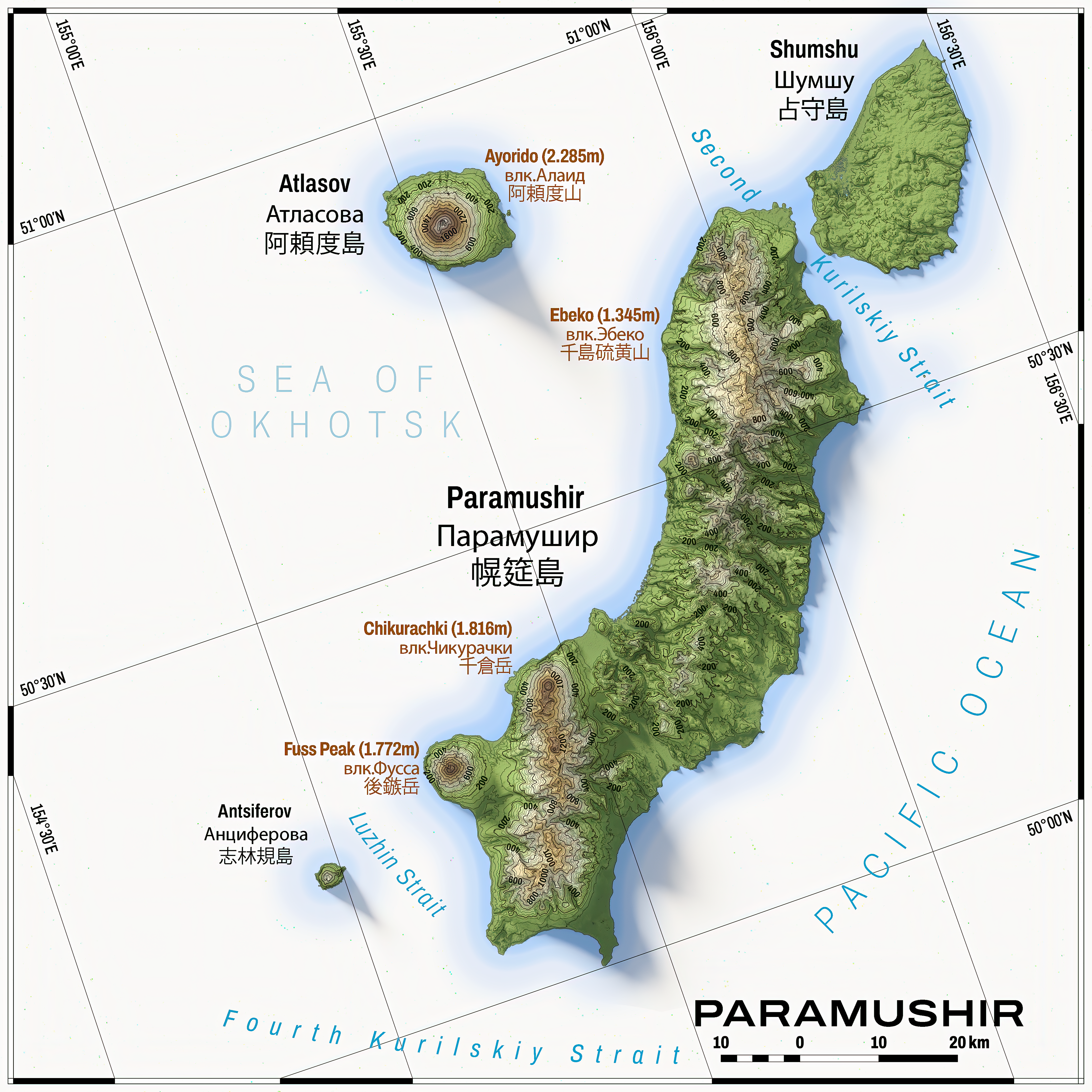
Topographic map showing Fuss Peak on the southwest coast of Paramushir

== History ==
The volcano was discovered in 1805 during the first Russian circumnavigation of the Earth and named in honor of a Swiss mathematician Nicolas Fuss, who served as the permanent secretary to the Academy of Sciences in St. Petersburg. Only one unambiguous eruption, in 1854, is known. Fuss Peak is still active.

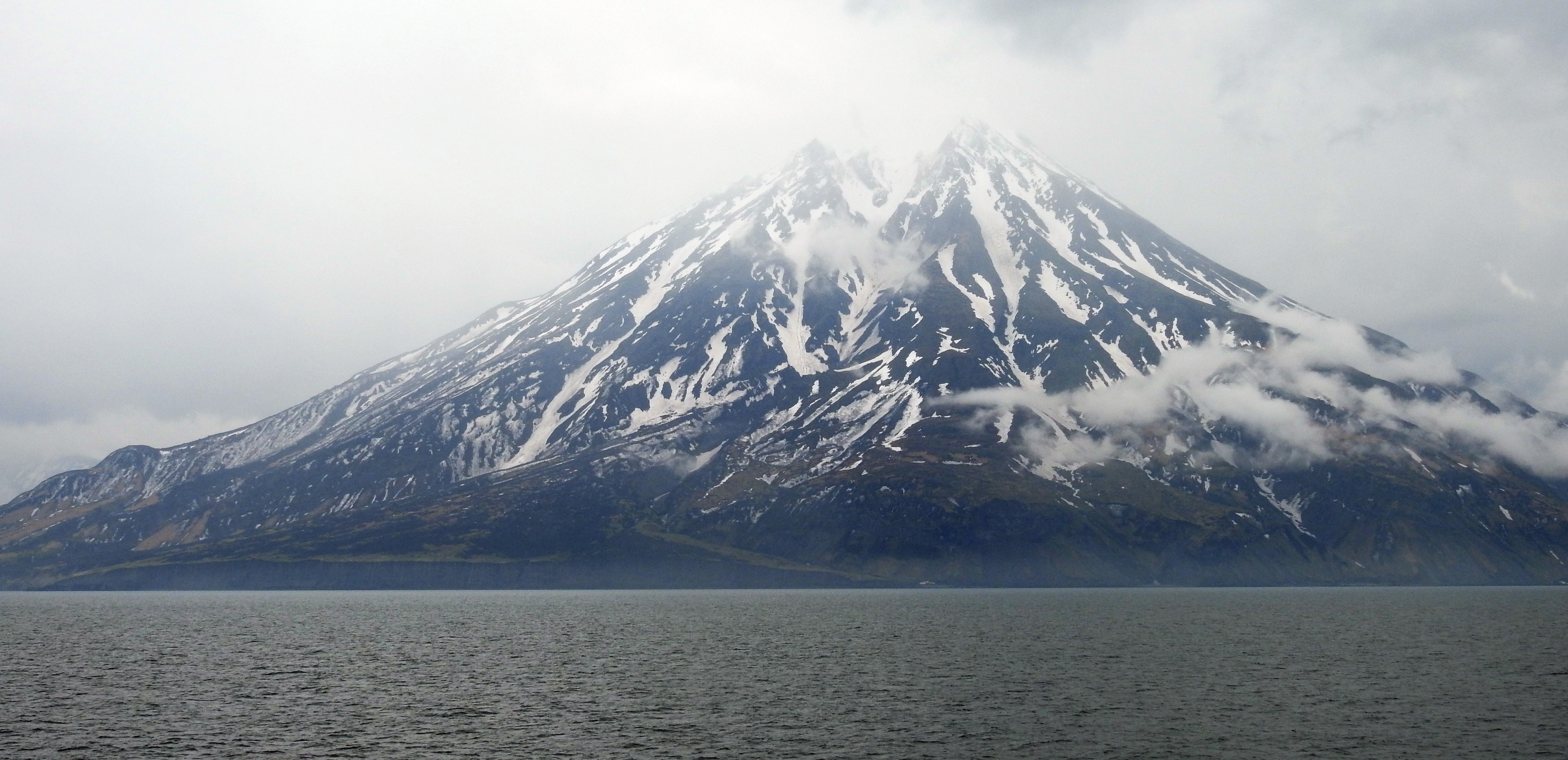
View of Fuss Peak from the northwest

== See also ==
- List of volcanoes in Russia
- List of ultras of Northeast Asia

== Sources ==
- "Fuss Peak". Global Volcanism Program. Smithsonian Institution.
- "Pik Fuss, Russia". Peakbagger.com.
