= Vilnius University Astronomical Observatory =

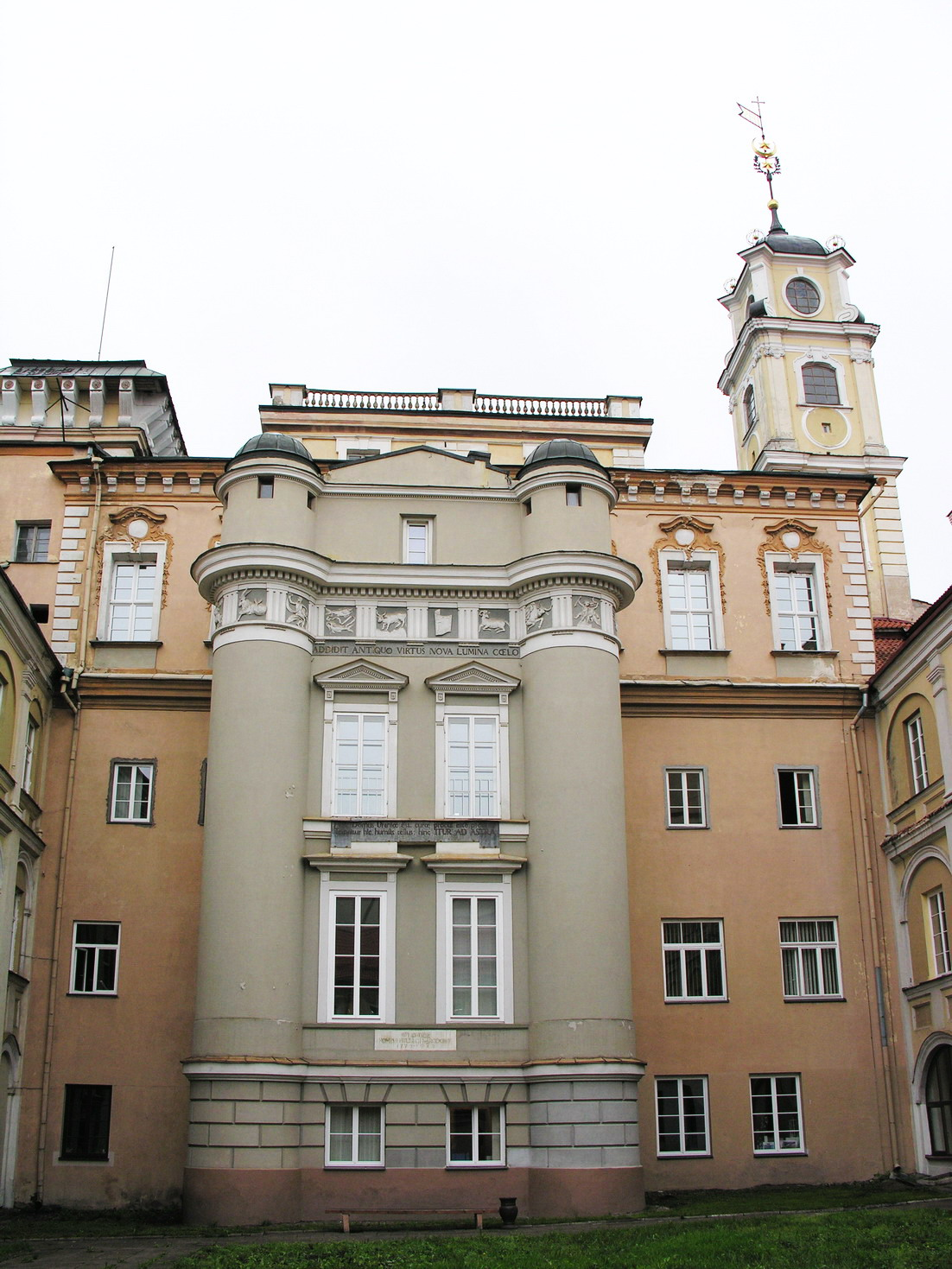
- The building of old Astronomical Observatory (south extension by Marcin Knackfuss)
- Alternative names: Vilnius University Astronomical Observatory
- Organization: Vilnius University
- Observatory code: 70 (before 1939), 570 (after 1939)
- Location: Vilnius, Lithuania
- Coordinates: 54°40′59.2″N 25°17′11.4″E
- Altitude: 101 metres (331 ft)
- Established: 1753
- Closed: 1881 (reopened in 1919)
- Website: www.astro.ff.vu.lt
- Architect: Marcin Knackfuss
- Related media on Commons

The Vilnius University Astronomical Observatory (Lithuanian: Vilniaus universiteto astronomijos observatorija) is an astronomical observatory of Vilnius University. It was founded in 1753 by the initiative of Thomas Zebrowski. The observatory is the fourth oldest observatory in the Europe. While the observatory is no longer able to make astronomical observations due to light pollution in Vilnius (observations are carried out at Molėtai Astronomical Observatory), it continues scientific research.

== Early history ==
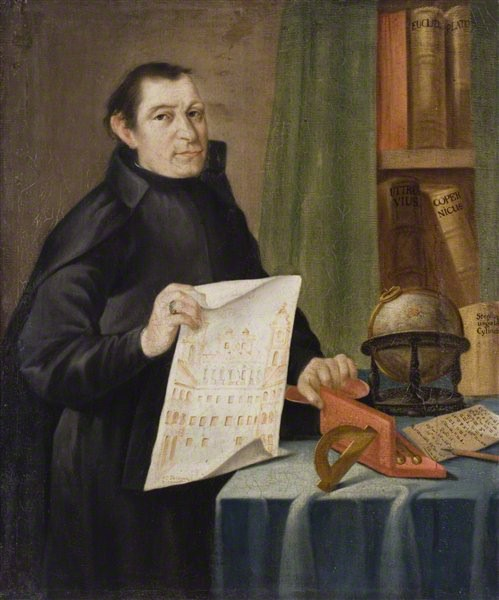
Thomas Zebrowski holding picture of Vilnius University Observatory

In 1753, by the initiative of Thomas Zebrowski, the Vilnius University Astronomical Observatory was established, which was among the first observatories in Europe and the first in the Polish-Lithuanian Commonwealth. The construction was funded by Elżbieta Ogińska Countess Puzynina. The first telescope (13.5 cm reflector) was donated by Michał Kazimierz "Rybeńko" Radziwiłł, Grand Hetman of the army of the Grand Duchy of Lithuania. Second, 10 cm reflector, was donated by bishop of Vilnius Józef Stanisław Sapieha.

The golden age of the Observatory began when Marcin Odlanicki Poczobutt was its director (1764–1807). In 1777, Poczobutt created a constellation entitled Taurus Poniatovii to honor Stanisław August Poniatowski, King of Poland and Grand Duke of Lithuania. He was remembered as a very skillful observer who left a large amount of observational data. Later those observations were used by Jérôme Lalande in his calculations of the orbit of Mercury. Poczobutt also sanctioned the extension of the Observatory to the south. It was designed and built by the prominent architect Marcin Knackfus in 1782–88.

Later the observatory was headed by Jan Śniadecki (1807–1825) and Piotr Sławinski (1825–1843). They observed planets, their satellites, asteroids and comets, eclipses of the Sun and Moon. In 1861, Georg Thomas Sabler, the director of the observatory, proposed to acquire for that purpose new instruments, among which were a solar photoheliograph, a photometer and a spectroscope. Spectroscopic observations of the Sun and photometric observations of stars were subsequently initiated. A photoheliograph was successfully acquired in 1864; it was the second such device in the entire world (after the one in London). In 1868, systematic photographic research of sunspot dynamics was launched, the first of its kind.

In 1876, a fire broke out in the observatory, causing heavy damage. The observatory did not receive any funds for restoration and five years later was closed. The library and instruments were distributed among various institutions of the Russian Empire, the main part of which was transferred to the Pulkovo Observatory.

== After World War I ==
The astronomical observatory was revived only after World War I. In Vilnius, then occupied by Poland, a Department of Astronomy was set up at the reopened Vilnius University. Władysław Dziewulski, a prominent Polish astronomer, was appointed as the head of this department. The location of the old observatory was no longer suitable for astronomical observations. Therefore, in 1921 it was decided to build a new observatory. For that purpose a site was allocated on the outskirts of the city near Vingis Park on the present M.K.Čiurlionis street. The observatory was equipped with two 15 cm Zeiss astrographs and a 48 cm reflector with a spectrograph.

== After World War II ==
After World War II activities of Lithuanian astronomers resumed at the newly-named Astronomical Observatory of Vilnius University. Professor Paulius Slavėnas became the head of the observatory. In 1957–62, several instruments (the 12 cm and 16 cm astrographs, 25 cm and 48 cm reflectors and the slitless Zeiss spectrograph) were restored and renovated. Research of variable stars and photometric observations using the Vilnius multicolour photometric system, created by Vytautas Straižys, began.

After the expansion of Vilnius, accurate astronomical observations became impossible due to air and light pollution in the 1960s. In 1968, the 48 cm telescope was moved to Simeiz Observatory in Crimea where it was in use up to 1973. Later it was moved to Maidanak Observatory in Uzbekistan. In 1974, the 63 cm reflector was put in operation at Molėtai Astronomical Observatory. The observatory became involved in the design and construction of photometric equipment for telescopes, in the study of variable stars, physical and chemical properties of stars, interstellar matter, as well as the structure of the Milky Way, Andromeda, and Triangulum galaxies. In 1960–92, in collaboration with the Institute of Physics and Mathematics, the Astronomical Observatory published the Bulletin of the Vilnius Astronomical Observatory.

== Directors ==
Portrait	Name	Tenure
	Thomas Zebrowski	1753–1758
	Jakub Nakcjanowicz	1758–1764
	Marcin Odlanicki Poczobutt	1764–1807
	Jan Śniadecki	1807–1825
	Piotr Sławinski	1825–1843
	Michał Hłuszniewicz	1843–1848
	Georg Albert Fuss	1848–1854
	Georg Thomas Sabler	1854–1865
	Matvey Gusev	1865–1866
	Pyotr Smyslov	1866–1881
	Władysław Dziewulski	1922–1940
	Bernardas Kodatis	1940–1944
	Paulius Slavėnas	1944–1952
	Borisas Voronkovas	1952–1956
	Paulius Slavėnas	1956–1969
	Alfonsas Misiukas-Misiūnas	1969–1978
	Romualdas Kalytis	1978–1992
	Jokūbas Sūdžius	1992–2008
	Vladas Vansevičius	2008–2017

== See also ==
- List of Jesuit sites
