= Pyotr Smyslov =

Russian astronomer (1827–1891)

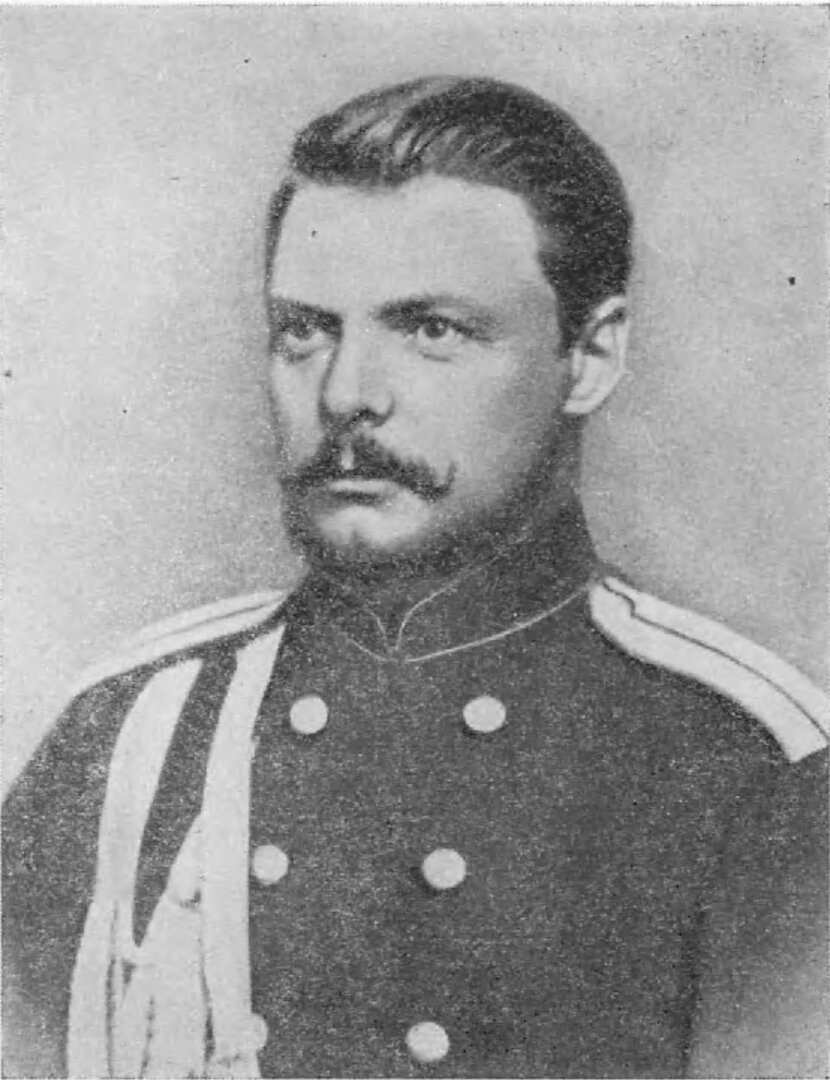
- Born: Pyotr Mikhailovich Smyslov; 14 June 1827; Novgorod Governorate, Russian Empire
- Died: 6 December 1891 (aged 64); Vilnius, Russian Empire
- Scientific career
- Fields: Astronomy, geodesics
- Workplaces: Pulkovo Observatory, Vilnius University Astronomical Observatory

Pyotr Mikhailovich Smyslov (Russian: Пётр Михайлович Смыслов, Lithuanian: Piotras Smyslovas; 14 June 1827 – 6 December 1891) was a Russian astronomer and geodesist. Smyslov was the tenth and last director of the Vilnius University Astronomical Observatory (1866–1881) before its closure.

== Biography ==
Smyslov was born in the Novgorod Governorate on 14 June 1827. In 1841 he began service in the Imperial Topographic Service in St. Petersburg, participating in surveys of Pskov and Vitebsk. He graduated in 1852 from a war topographer school and was appointed to the geodetic department of the Imperial Topographic Service. Smyslov attended lectures by Friedrich Georg Wilhelm von Struve in Pulkovo Observatory. Smyslov was then appointed as an astronomer-observer in an expedition that carried out chronometric measurements between Moscow and Astrakhan, as well as Pulkovo and Arkhangelsk. Smyslov began working at the Pulkovo Observatory in 1854. Appointed as an adjunct professor in 1855, Smyslov taught practical astronomy and geodesy to officers of the Nicholas General Staff Academy, where "many prominent Russian geodesists were his students". Smyslov continued participating in various expeditions; in 1857, he took part in an expedition that determined the longitudes of Arkhangelsk, Astrakhan, and other Volga River cities, as well as localities in Kursk, Novgorod, and provinces of St. Petersburg.

In 1862 Smyslov was sent to Warsaw to experiment with a rangefinder invented by Otto Wilhelm von Struve, son of Friedrich Georg Wilhelm von Struve. From 1863 onwards, Smyslov carried out astronomical observations in Moscow. In 1859 or 1863 he published a book on chronometers and the Repsold meridian circle (Репсольдов круг, хронометры, хронометрическая экспедиция), for which he received the Demidov Prize. Smyslov was a member of the Heidelberg Astronomical Society and Russian Geographical Society since 1863. In 1865 Smyslov published another monograph on the comparison of various methods for determining longitudes using a telegraph. In 1866 he became director of the Vilnius University Astronomical Observatory. Smyslov provided the observatory with new equipment for solar observation and began the first systemic observations of the Sun in 1868. He submitted detailed reports on his work to the Imperial Academy of Sciences. From 1866 to 1869, Smyslov and others measured the acceleration of the fall of a free body along the meridian from Jakobstad via Tartu to Vilnius with a tilting pendulum. From the experiment's data, it was possible to conclude that the shape of the Earth was an ellipsoid. On 18 January 1883, Smyslov was dismissed from service due to the closure of his observatory in Vilnius, and was awarded the rank of major general. Smyslov spent the remainder of his life in Vilnius, being a member of the Vilnius Provincial Statistical Committee. For the convenience of the city folk, an electric clock connected to an accurate astronomical clock was installed in the tower of the city's observatory.

Smyslov died in Vilnius on 6 December 1891. He was buried in the Liepkalnis Orthodox cemetery. His name is engraved on the 1872 medal in memory of the 50th anniversary of the corps of military topographers (В память 50-летия Корпуса военных топографов).
