= Padvarninkai meteorite =

Meteorite in Lithuania

Padvarninkai
- Type: Achondrite
- Class: Asteroidal achondrite
- Clan: HED meteorite
- Group: Eucrite
- Country: Lithuania
- Region: Anykščiai District Municipality
- Coordinates: 55°40′N 25°00′E
- Observed fall: Yes
- Fall date: 9 February 1929
- Found date: 1 September 1929
- TKW: 4,932 grams (174.0 oz)
- Alternative names: Andrioniškis

Padvarninkai meteorite is a meteorite that fell on 9 February 1929 near the village of Padvarninkai located near Andrioniškis, Anykščiai District Municipality, Lithuania. It is a rare eucrite that contains maskelynite (a glassy phase found in some meteorite impact craters) and is highly shocked.

== History ==
Lithuanian press reported on 13 February 1929 that a meteorite fell somewhere near Biržai or Valkininkai. Professor Kazys Sleževičius of Vytautas Magnus University published a call to the public to provide information. He received about 100 written notes that helped to narrow down the area and determine the fall time at about 45 minutes past midnight on 9 February. ELTA published the narrowed down location on 2 April and the public started sending in various stranger looking stones, but the first piece of the meteorite was received only on 1 September. It was found near Padvarninkai and scientists investigated the area, but found no additional fragments. Locals collected 11 pieces with a total weight of 3,858 grams (136.1 oz) that were donated to the university plus at least two other fragments that remained in private hands. The largest donated fragments weighted 2,128 and 589 grams (75.1 and 20.8 oz). The exact location of the finds is unknown but the strewn field was estimated at 10 square kilometres (3.9 sq mi). In May 1969, another piece weighing 1,073.5 grams (37.87 oz) was found about 6 kilometres (3.7 mi) from Padvarninkai.

Padvarninkai did not receive much scientific interest because the main fragments were held behind the Iron Curtain and were largely inaccessible to western scientists. New studies began to be published in early 1990s. Three full fragments, including the main mass, and two broken-off samples are kept at the Geology Museum of Vilnius University. The piece found in 1969 is held by the Institute of Geology and Geography in Vilnius. Other fragments are held: 126 grams (4.4 oz) by the Russian Academy of Science, 87 grams (3.1 oz) by the National Museum in Prague, 50 grams (1.8 oz) by the Natural History Museum in London, 30 grams (1.1 oz) by the Bartoschewitz Meteorite Lab in Gifhorn, 28.6 grams (1.01 oz) by the National Museum of Natural History in Paris, 12.5 grams (0.44 oz) by the Field Museum of Natural History in Chicago, 9.7 grams (0.34 oz) by the Geological Survey of Canada, and others.

== Analysis ==
Upon initial observation, Padvarninkai was classified as a shergottite due to the presence of maskelynite (a glassy material found in some meteorite impact craters). At the time, the class had only two meteorites, the Shergotty meteorite and Padvarninkai. The classification was reassessed when the Zagami meteorite fell in 1962. Padvarninkai is now classified as a monomict eucrite (i.e. eucrite with breccia of a single rock type).

Padvarninkai, as many other eucrites, is rich in both pyroxene (mostly orthopyroxene with exsolved augite) and plagioclase (mostly bytownite and anorthite) with small amounts of chromite, ilmenite, pigeonite, tridymite and troilite. While in this regard Padvarninkai is a typical eucrite, it is highly unusual due to its plentiful features that indicate extreme shocks, such as suevitic (melted) black veins and vitrified (glassy) sections. The melt veins were likely a result of temperatures reaching 1,400–1,500 °C (2,550–2,730 °F). Three primary lithologies were described in 1991: (1) fine and coarse grained of clasts of typical eucritic material, (2) a fine grained quenched texture that is a result of rapid cooling, and (3) a partially glassy matrix surrounding various clasts of pyroxene, feldspar and tridymite. Very small zircon grains, present in the first lithology, showed uranium concentration of 30–60 ppm but were fully depleted of europium.

Small amounts of apatite and the zircon grains allowed dating Padvarninkai utilizing various radiometric dating methods. The lead–lead dating of the zircon grains yielded the age of Padvarninkai of 4.55 billion years. Other studies yielded similar results. Other methods were used to date other events between the initial formation 4.55 billion years ago to the collision with Earth in 1929. Using the argon–argon and rubidium–strontium dating, scientists have provisionally identified three impacts 4.1, 3.8, and 1.15 billion years ago.
