= Kena (Vilnius) =

- Village
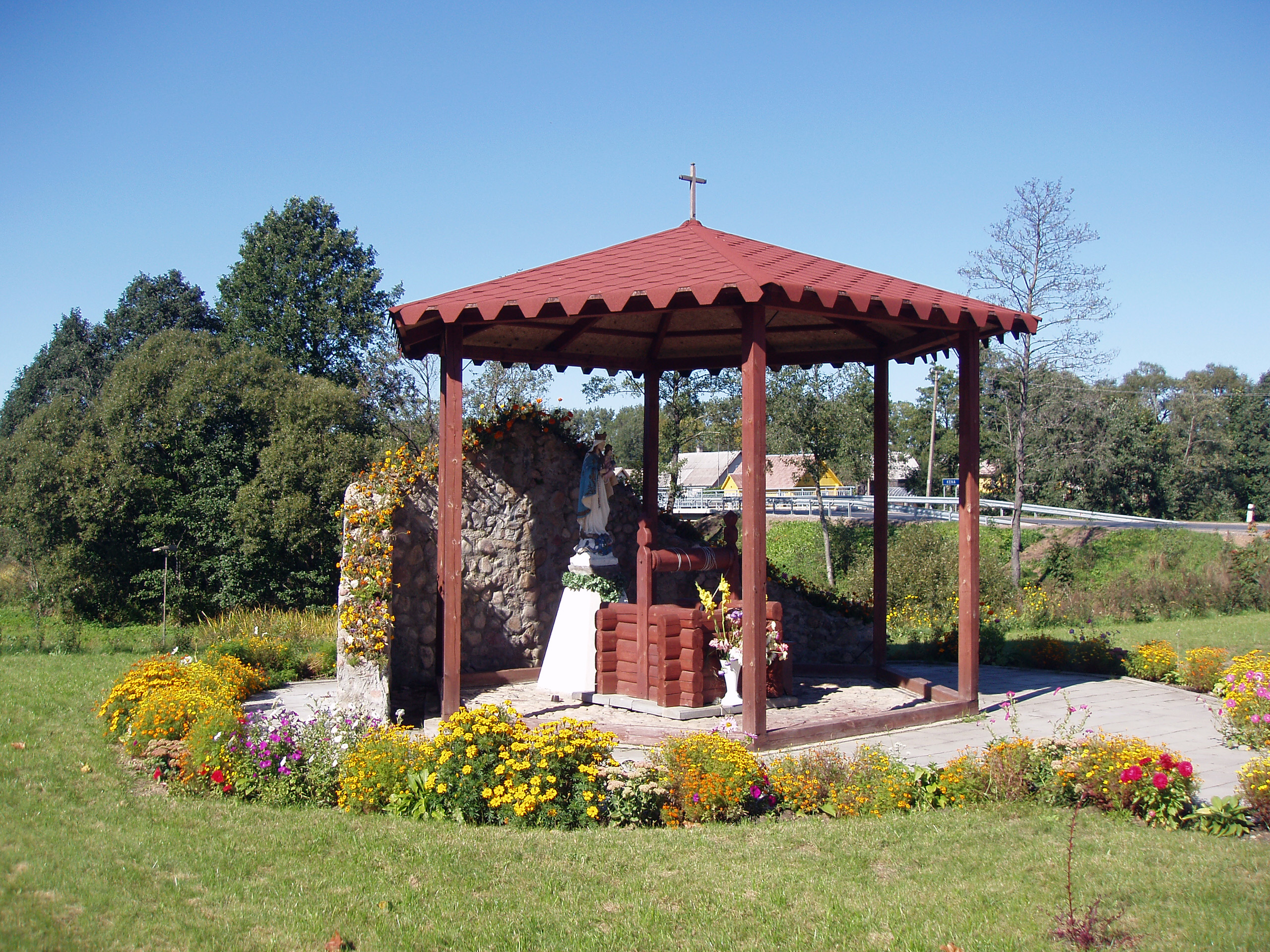
- Well near the church

- Location of Kena
- Coordinates: 54°39′N 25°38′E
- Country: Lithuania
- County: Vilnius County
- Municipality: Vilnius district municipality
- Eldership: Rukainiai eldership

Population (2021)
  - Total: 369
- Time zone: UTC+2 (EET)
  - Summer (DST): UTC+3 (EEST)

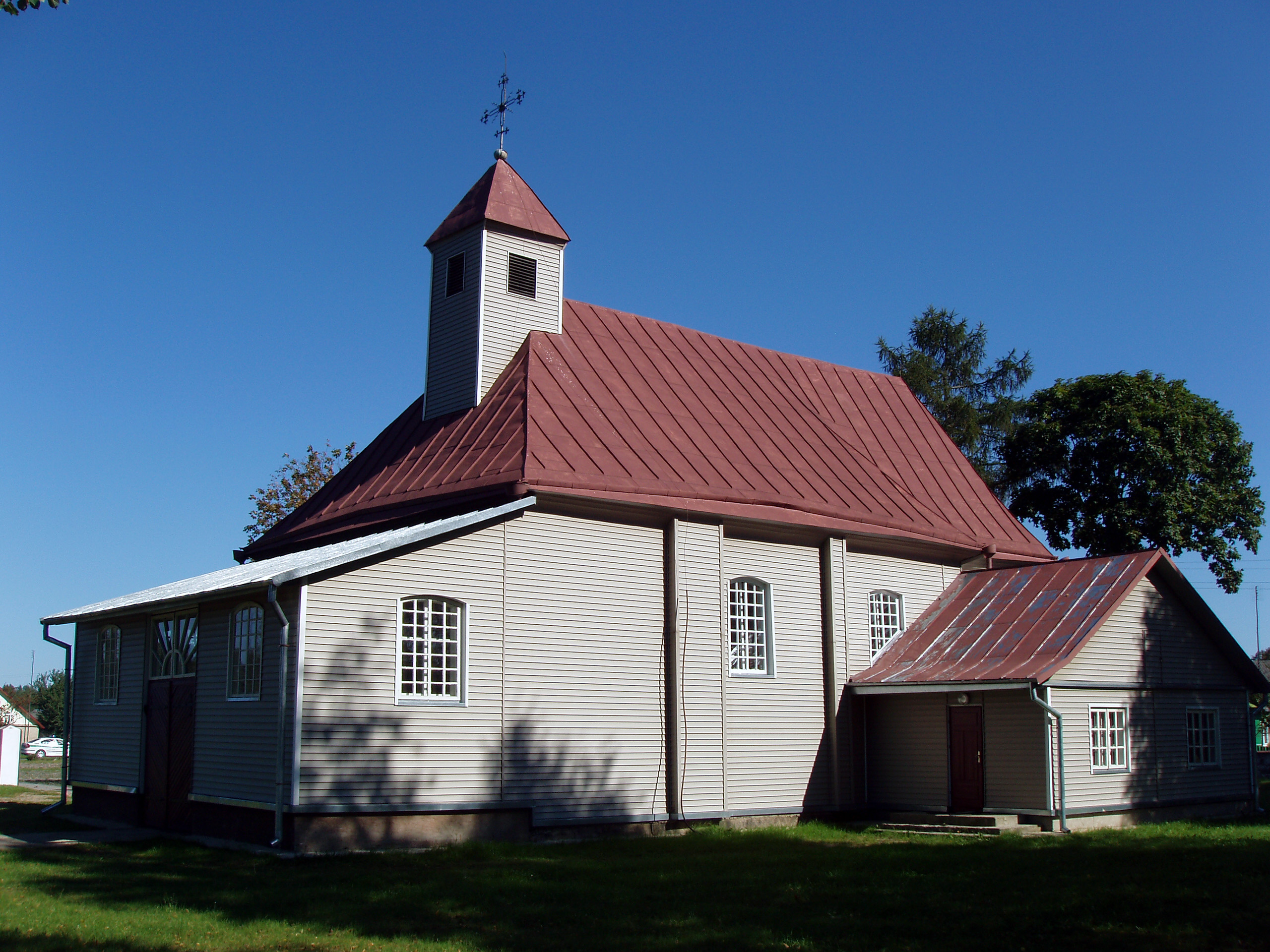
The Church of Our Lady of the Gate of Dawn in Kena

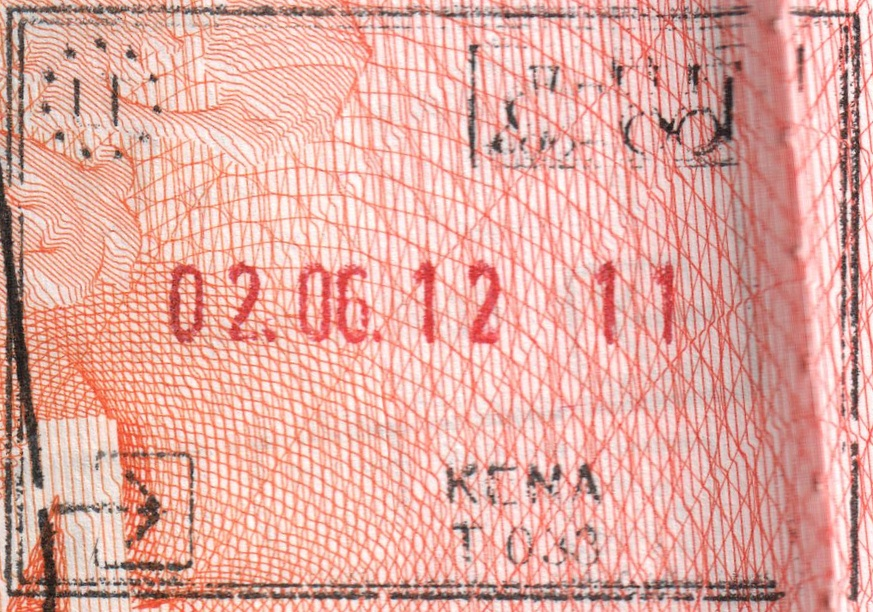
Passport stamp from the border with Belarus

Kena is a village in Vilnius district municipality, Lithuania. It is located on the state border with Belarus and has railway customs for all passenger trains from/to Belarus and Russia, including transit trains to Kaliningrad Oblast. According to the census of 2001, Kena had 418 residents. The figure shrank to 369 in 2021. Nearby Pakenė village had 204 inhabitants.
