= Paul Fuss =

Russian mathematician (1797–1855)

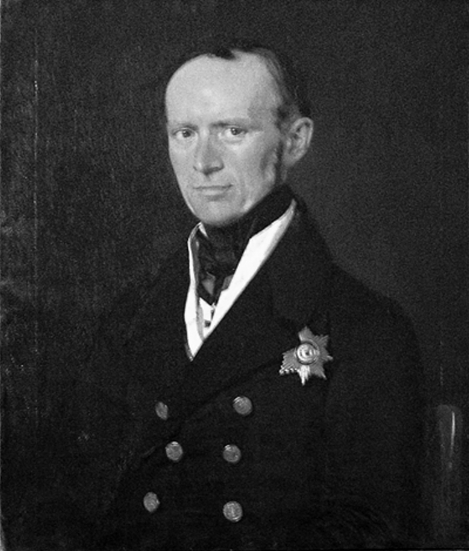
Portrait, c. 1840

Paul Heinrich Fuss, also known as Pavel Nikolayevich Fuss (Russian: Павел Николаевич Фуcс; 2 June [O.S. 22 May] 1798 – 22 January [O.S. 10 January] 1855), was a Russian mathematician who served as secretary of the Imperial Academy of Sciences in Saint Petersburg.

Fuss was born in Saint Petersburg where his father Nicolas Fuss was a mathematician of Swiss origin married to Albertine Benedikte Philippine Luise Euler (1766–1822), granddaughter of Leonhard Euler. Picking up mathematical interests early in life, he worked on a solution of algebraic equations of the third degree. In 1818 he became an assistant at the Imperial Academy of Sciences, becoming a full member in 1826. After the death of his father in 1826, he became a permanent secretary at the academy and was involved in the publication of the academy reports. He edited the works of deceased members of the academy. In 1842 he worked on Euler's correspondence and writings which was finally published in 1849.

== Sources ==
- "Фусс, Павел Николаевич" . Brockhaus and Efron Encyclopedic Dictionary (in Russian). 1906.
