= Melotte 186 =

Open cluster

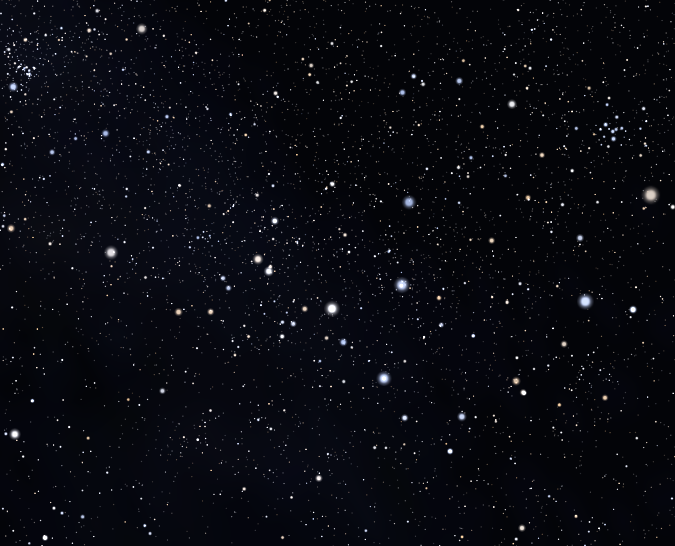
- Simulated image of Melotte 186

Observation data (J2000.0 epoch)
- Right ascension: 18^{h} 01^{m} 06.0^{s}
- Declination: +02° 54′ 00″
- Distance: 652 ly (200 pc)
- Apparent magnitude (V): 3.0
- Apparent dimensions (V): 240'

Physical characteristics
- Estimated age: 100 million years
- Other designations: Mel 186, Cr 359

Associations
- Constellation: Ophiuchus

Melotte 186 (also known as Collinder 359) is a large, loosely bound open cluster located in the constellation Ophiuchus. It has an apparent magnitude of 3.0 and an approximate size of 240 arc-minutes.

== History ==
Due to its enormous size, this cluster was never recognized as such before the 20th century. The British astronomer Philibert Jacques Melotte was the first to notice it, who described it in his 1915 catalogue of star clusters as a large group of stars scattered around the star 67 Ophiuchi. In 1931, it was re-observed by Swedish astronomer Per Collinder, who described it as a group of 15 stars devoid of appreciable concentration, providing measurements of its member stars.

== Characteristics ==
Mel 186 is an object of considerable size both real and apparent, which corresponds to a low concentration of its member stars. Its distance is controversial and the various estimates depend mainly on which stars are considered effective members or not; several estimates that indicated it as located at 249 parsecs (812 light years) are contrasted with more recent estimates that place it at as many as 450 parsecs (1467 light years).

Age is also the subject of debate, with measurements showing significant differences also here on the basis of which stars are considered as members; initial estimates have indicated an age of 20-30 million years, while more recent studies fix its origin at 100 million years, on the basis of measurements of as many as 628 possible star members with a mass between 1.3 and 0.03 M ⊙ . According to various studies it emerges that the Mel 186 stars have the same proper motion, average age and average distance as those of the nearby cluster IC 4665, suggesting a possible interaction between the two objects in the early stages of their existence; on the other hand, Mel 186 can also be seen as a scattered stellar association rather than a real open cluster due to the considerable distance between its components.

== Observing ==
Melotte 186 is located in the northeastern part of the constellation Ophiuchus, just west of the star Beta Ophiuchi. Due to its declination close to the celestial equator, the cluster can be observed from any latitude of Earth. The best time to observe the cluster is between June and October.

The cluster is composed of magnitude 4–5 stars scattered over a 240 arc-minute region of the night sky. Though the open cluster is visible to the naked eye, it does not contrast well against the night sky due to its sparse appearance. Through binoculars one can resolve several dozen more stars down to magnitude 8, which are mainly concentrated around the eastern side of the cluster. Due to its large size, telescopes do not afford an improved view of the cluster.

The brighter stars make up the "face" of the former constellation Taurus Poniatovii, due to their V-shaped formation which resembles the Hyades cluster.

== See also ==
- Melotte 20
