= Thomas Zebrowski =

Jesuit scientist (1714–1758)

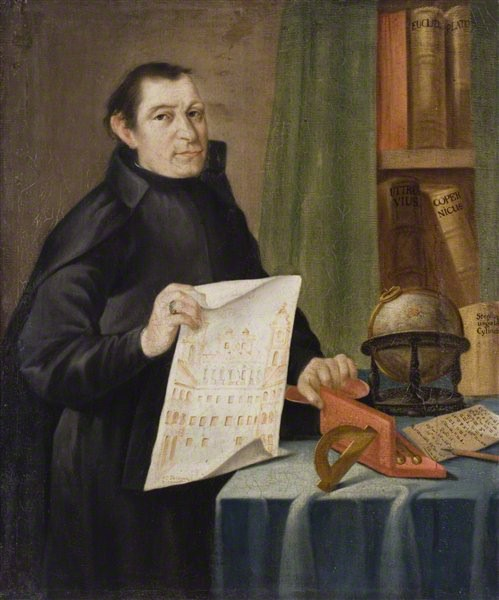
Portrait of Zebrowski by unknown painter shows him holding a picture of the Vilnius Observatory

Thomas Zebrowski (Lithuanian: Tomas Žebrauskas, Polish: Tomasz Żebrowski; November 24, 1714 in Samogitia – March 18, 1758 in Vilnius) was a Lithuanian Jesuit architect, mathematician, and astronomer. He was instrumental in establishing and funding the Observatory of Vilnius University. Marcin Odlanicki Poczobutt was among his students.

== Biography ==
Tomasz Żebrowski was born in 1714. At the age of 18, he entered the Jesuit novitiate in Vilnius. Zebrowski studied then philosophy and theology at Vilnius University achievieng a doctorate. After studying at Charles University in Prague under Joseph Stepling in 1750–52, Zebrowski returned to Vilnius on 25 September 1752, becoming a popular lecturer of physics and astronomy at Vilnius University. He was also interested in geodesy, horology, mineralogy, geography.

However, his major passion was astronomy and he pursued funding for an observatory. The construction was funded by Elżbieta Ogińska-Puzynina, while Mikołaj Radziwiłł and bishop Józef Sapieha donated 13.5-centimetre (5.3 in) and 10-centimetre (3.9 in) diameter reflector telescopes manufactured in Germany. Zebrowski designed the observatory; its construction began in 1753.

From 1753, he simultaneously began work on the construction of a new church in Ilūkste, traveling there several times for this purpose. At the time of his death, the building was still far from completion. During this period, he also oversaw the design of the Jesuit college in Zhodishki, whose foundations were laid only in 1757. Żebrowski’s last known project is the Benedictine nuns’ church in Kražiai, which he also did not complete.

Żebrowski died prematurely on March 18, 1758.

== Bibliography ==
- Bednarski, Stanisław (1933). Upadek i odrodzenie szkół jezuickich w Polsce (in Polish). Kraków.
- Zubovas, Vladimiras (1978). "Uzupełnienia do biografii Tomasza Żebrowskiego". Biuletyn Historii Sztuki. 40 (3).
