= Matvey Gusev =

Russian astronomer

- Матвей Гусев
- Born: 28 November 1826; Vyatka, Russian Empire
- Died: 22 April 1866 (aged 39); Berlin, Kingdom of Prussia
- Known for: Non-sphericity of the Moon; Astrophotography
- Scientific career
- Fields: astronomy
- Workplaces: Pulkovo Observatory; Vilnius Observatory

Matvey Matveyevich Gusev (Russian: Матвей Матвеевич Гусев; 28 November [O.S. 16 November] 1826 – 22 April [O.S. 10 April] 1866) was a Russian astronomer who worked at Pulkovo Observatory near St. Petersburg from 1850 to 1852 and then at Vilnius Observatory.

In 1860 he founded the first scientific journal dedicated to math and physics in Russia: Vestnik matematicheskikh nauk (Вестник математических наук). He became the director of the Vilnius Observatory in 1865.

He was first to prove the non-sphericity of the Moon, concluding in 1860 that it is elongated in the direction of the Earth. He is considered one of the pioneers in using photography in astronomy, having taken pictures of the Moon and the Sun - including sunspots - while at the Vilnius observatory.

He died in Berlin, Germany in 1866. A major crater on Mars is named Gusev crater after him, and it is famed as the landing site of the Mars Exploration Rover Spirit.
