= Paulius Slavėnas =

Lithuanian astronomer (1901–1991)

- Born: Paulius Slavėnas; 21 July 1901; Moscow, Russian Empire
- Died: 24 February 1991 (aged 89); Vilnius, Lithuania
- Education: Moscow State University, Yale University (doctorate; 1928)
- Scientific career
- Fields: Astronomy
- Workplaces: Vilnius University Astronomical Observatory
- Doctoral advisor: Ernest William Brown

Paulius Slavėnas (21 July 1901 – 24 February 1991) was a Lithuanian astronomer, mathematician, and science historian who headed the Vilnius University Astronomical Observatory twice, from 1944 to 1952, and from 1956 to 1969.

== Biography ==
Paulius Slavėnas was born on 21 July 1901 in Moscow, the Russian Empire. His father was Vincas Slavėnas (1874–1939), and his mother, Liubovė Kvalkova-Burštein was an accoucher. In 1918, he graduated from the Grigory Shelaputin gymnasium and entered the faculty of physics and mathematics of the Moscow State University. From 1921 to 1923, Slavėnas served in the Red Army. His father returned to Lithuania in 1922 and settled in Marijampolė. After returning to Lithuania himself, Slavėnas continued his studies at the University of Lithuania, from which he graduated in 1925. After receiving a stipend from the Rockefeller Foundation, Slavėnas traveled to the United States. He graduated from Yale University with a doctoral degree in 1928. His doctoral advisor was Ernest William Brown, and his dissertation was on the three-body problem. During his study years in the country, Slavėnas visited (and sometimes worked at) many observatories, read science popularization lectures, communicated with Lithuanian-Americans, and published scientific press. He received attention from various specialists, and Slavėnas became a member of the International Astronomical Union, the American Astronomical Society, the Royal Astronomical Society, the Société astronomique de France, and the Astronomische Gesellschaft. From 1929 to 1930, Slavėnas served in the Lithuanian Army. From 1930 to 1931 he was a lecturer and professor at Vytautas Magnus University. During the German occupation of Lithuania, he was fired by the authorities for his participation in establishing the Union of Cultural Cooperation between Greater Lithuania and Lithuania Minor in 1933–1936. Additionally, he was the union's chairman from 1936 to 1939.

From 1944 Slavėnas became a professor of Vilnius University. In 1944–1952, and later in 1956–1969 Slavėnas headed the Vilnius University Astronomical Observatory and the university's astronomy department. Slavėnas also continued to lecture at Vytautas Magnus University from 1944 to 1952. In 1949 he was elected as a corresponding member of the Lithuanian Academy of Sciences of the Lithuanian SSR, and was made a real member in 1968. From 1949 to 1953 Slavėnas was the scientific secretary of the academy's presidium. From 1950 to 1987, Slavėnas headed the Society of Lithuanian Science Historians and Philosophers. From 1950 to 1987 Slavėnas was chairman of the Commission for the History of Natural Sciences and Technology at the presidium of the academy. From 1954 to 1971 Slavėnas was a member of the Council of Astronomers of the Academy of Sciences of the Soviet Union. In 1959 he founded a group of astronomers at the academy's institute of physics and mathematics. He headed the work of Lithuanian historians of science. From 1960 to 1968, he was the editor of the Bulletin of the Vilnius Astronomical Observatory. From 1966, Slavėnas was a member correspondent of the International Academy of the History of Science. From 1959 to 1971, Slavėnas was deputy chief of Soviet encyclopedia of Lithuania Minor. From 1960 onwards, under his care, the Commission for the History of Nature and Technology began to publish "From the History of Sciences in Lithuania".

The most important areas of Slavėnas's scientific research were the structure and evolution of the universe and stars, astrophotometric research, the basics of the theory of relativity, history and systematics of science, and the scientific worldview. From 1926 to 1990, Slavėnas published 15 books. He published more than 870 scientific and science popularization articles. For his active scientific work he was awarded the title of merited scientific figure of the Lithuanian SSR. Furthermore, Slavėnas was awarded several Soviet orders and medals letters of honor.

Slavėnas died on 24 February 1991 in Vilnius. A memorial plaque was uncovered at his former home in 1996.
