= Marcin Odlanicki Poczobutt =

Polish-Lithuanian Jesuit and mathematician

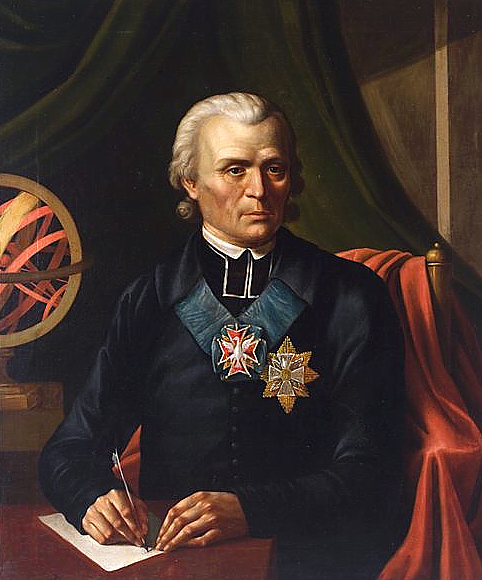
- Potrait by Józef Oleszkiewicz
- Born: October 30, 1728; Słomianka
- Died: February 20, 1810; Dyneburg
- Education: Vilnius University and Charles University

Marcin Odlanicki Poczobutt (Lithuanian: Martynas Počobutas; 30 October 1728 near Grodno – 7 February 1810 in Daugavpils) was a Polish–Lithuanian Jesuit, astronomer and mathematician. He was professor of Vilnius University for over 50 years, serving as its rector from 1780 to 1799. The crater Poczobutt on the Moon is named after him, as is the main-belt asteroid 191775 Poczobut. Poczobutt is also the author of the University's motto, Hinc itur ad astra (from here one rises to the stars).

== Career ==
Marcin Odlanicki Poczobutt was born in the village of Salomenka near Grodno, within Lithuania proper. He studied at Vilnius University (1745–1751) and Charles University in Prague (1754–1756). With brief interruptions he lectured at Vilnius University from 1753 to 1808. Sponsored by Michał Fryderyk Czartoryski, he further studied in France, Italy, and Germany from 1762 to 1764. His stay at the Marseille Observatory under Esprit Pézenas inspired him to devote his career to astronomy. He earned doctorate of philosophy, gained professorship, and became director of the Vilnius Astronomical Observatory in 1764. The observatory, established by Thomas Zebrowski, was in its early stages of development and Poczobutt worked hard to obtain modern instruments. Despite suppression of the Jesuits in 1773, the observatory gained royal favour from King Stanisław August Poniatowski—it was named royal observatory and Poczobutt became King's astronomer. In 1780, Poczobutt was appointed as university rector by the Commission of National Education. He was tasked with reforming the university from a medieval school concentrated on humanities (philosophy and theology) to a modern scientific institution. Under Poczobutt the university improved its science, medicine, and law departments. As rector of the university he promoted the use of Latin and opposed any use of Polish or Lithuanian languages.

== Scientific work ==
He often travelled to London where he ordered astronomical equipment from Jesse Ramsden and John Dollond: a 4-foot transit telescope in 1765, 3.5-foot achromatic telescope in 1770, 8-foot mural quadrant in 1777, and meridian circle in 1788. Other purchases included octant, equatorial, two theodolites, 10-foot sextant. The observatory was expanded by architect Marcin Knackfus in 1782–1788 to accommodate the new equipment. Poczobutt observed solar and lunar eclipses, comets and asteroids (including Ceres, Pallas, Juno), and calculated geographic coordinates of settlements in the Grand Duchy of Lithuania (including Vilnius and Hrodna). In addition, he made measurements of Mercury to compute its orbit; later this data was used by Jérôme Lalande. He described 16-star constellation, which he named Taurus Poniatovii in honour of King Poniatowski (it is now obsolete and considered to be part of Ophiuchus). His recorded observations amounted to 34 volumes. In 1770 he became the first in Lithuania to systematically measure and record weather temperature (continuous records survive since 1777). Poczobutt was elected a fellow of the Royal Society in 1771 and a corresponding member of the French Academy of Sciences in 1778. He was made a member of the Order of Saint Stanislaus in 1785 and Order of the White Eagle in 1793.

== See also ==
- List of Roman Catholic scientist-clerics
