= Petrusewicz =

Petrusewicz is a Polish gender-neutral surname of Eash-Slavic origin. Archaic feminine forms: Petrusewiczowna (maiden name), Petrusewiczowa (surname by husband). It should be distinguished from the spelling Pietrusiewicz which conforms to the Polish phonology, which is usually a by-name in the noble Polish clan Wysoczański. It is a patronymic surname derived from the East Slavic given name Petrus', a diminutive of Piotr/Petro/Piatro (Peter).

Russian-language transliteration: Petrusevich, Belarusian: Petrusevich, Ukrainian: Petrusevych, Lithuanianized form: Petrusevičius. Latvian: Petrusēviča (feminine), Petrusēvičs (masculine)

Notable people with this surname include:

- Irena Hausmanowa-Petrusewicz (1917–2015), Polish doctor, neurologist
- Marek Petrusewicz (1934–1992), Polish swimmer
- Kazimierz Petrusewicz, Polish Communist revolutionary, professor
- Kazimierz Adam Petrusewicz, Polish and Russian revolutionary and lawyer
- Aleksey Petrusevich (1912– ?), Soviet engineer, recipient of Lenin and Stalin prizes
- Nikolai Petrusevich (1838–1880), Russian general, geologist, geographer, and scientist
- Ināra Petrusēviča (born 1969), Latvian artist
