= Manfred Kridl =

Polish historian (1882–1957)

Manfred Kridl (1882–1957) was a Polish historian of literature.

From 1932 Kridl taught at Wilno's Stefan Batory University, where he was an opponent of antisemitic ghetto-bench policy. In 1940, during World War II, Kridl managed to escape from occupied Poland and settled in the United States. There he taught at Smith College, then at Columbia University.

== Works ==
- Antagonizm wieszczów. Rzecz o stosunku Słowackiego do Mickiewicza, 1925
- Literatura polska w. XIX, 1925
- Główne prądy literatury europejskie. Klasycyzm, romantyzm, epoka poromantyczna, 1931
- Wstęp do badań nad dziełem literackim, 1936
- Literatura Polska, 1945
- Editor, For Your Freedom and Ours (the democratic heritage of Poland)
- A Survey of Polish Literature and Culture, 1956
- A. Mickiewicz – Poet of Poland (with other authors)
- The lyric poems of Juliusz Slowacki (Musagetes; contributions to the history of Slavic literature and culture)

== See also ==
- List of Poles
