= Botanical Garden of Vilnius University =

Botanic garden in Lithuania

Coordinates: 54°44′09″N 25°24′10″E

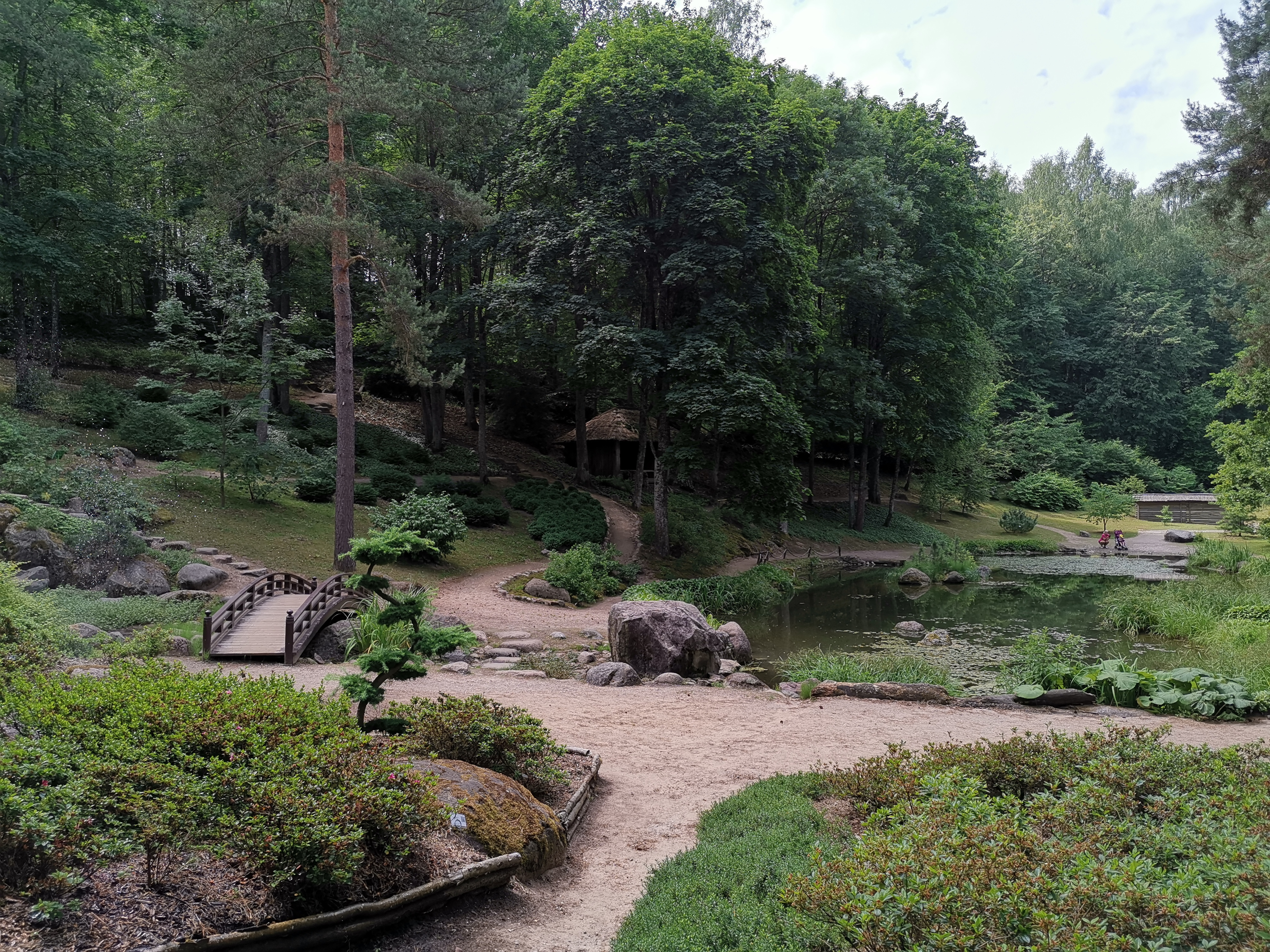
- Japanese-style garden in the Botanical Garden of Vilnius University (Kairėnai department)

- Location within Lithuania
- Interactive map of Botanical Garden of Vilnius University
- Type: Botanical garden
- Location: Vilnius; Lithuania
- Area: 198.85 hectares (491.4 acres)
- Opened: 1781
- Operator: Vilnius University
- Visitors: ~100,000
- Status: Open during the Summer season
- Website: Official website

Botanical Garden of Vilnius University (Lithuanian: Vilniaus universiteto botanikos sodas) is a botanical garden situated in Vilnius, Lithuania.

== History ==
The garden was established by professor Jean-Emmanuel Gilibert of Vilnius University in 1781. In 1832 the Vilnius University and Botanical Garden were closed. In 1919, the Botanical Garden of the Polish Stefan Batory University was started in a new location, in Vingis (known as Zakret at that time). In 1975 territory of the garden was expanded. Since then the main part of the garden is in Kairėnai (address: Kairėnų 43, LT-10239 Vilnius) which is situated in Antakalnis elderate of Vilnius. There is also a department of the garden in Vingis Park (address: M. K. Čiurlionio 110, LT-03100 Vilnius).

== Collection ==
The collection of the botanical garden includes 11,000 taxa of plants, including:

- 2,500 taxa in Department of Dendrology
- 3,000 taxa in Department of Plant Systematic and Geography
- 3,200 taxa in Department of Floriculture
- 300 taxa in Department of Plant Genetic
- 750 taxa in Department of Pomology
- 100 taxa in Laboratory of Plant Physiology and Isolated Tissue Cultures

About one third of the Lithuanian vascular plant inhabit the territory of the garden.

== Research ==
The botanical garden carries out research in the areas of biotechnology, horticulture, molecular genetics, conservation, ethnobotany, systematics and taxonomy.
