= Ghetto benches =

Form of official segregation in the seating of students

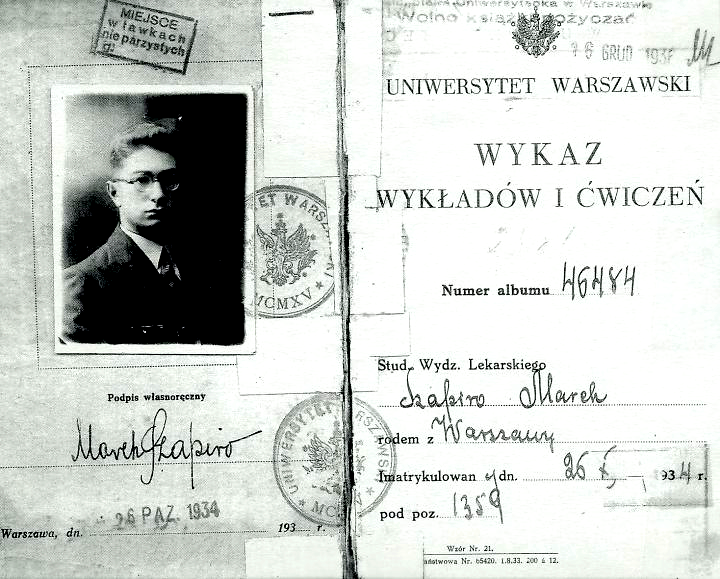
- The 1934 Index of a Polish-Jewish student at the Warsaw University Department of Medicine, with a stamp reading: Miejsce w ławkach nieparzystych (Seating in benches with an odd number)
- Location: Warsaw University, Lwów Polytechnic, Wilno University
- Period: 1935–1939

Ghetto benches (known in Polish as getto ławkowe) was a form of official segregation in the seating of university students, introduced in 1935 at the Lwów Polytechnic. Rectors at other higher education institutions in the Second Polish Republic had adopted this form of segregation when the practice became conditionally legalized by 1937. Under the ghetto ławkowe system, Jewish university students were required under threat of expulsion to sit in a left-hand side section of the lecture halls reserved exclusively for them. This official policy of enforced segregation was often accompanied by acts of violence directed against Jewish students by members of the ONR (outlawed after three months in 1934).

The seating in benches marked a peak of antisemitism in Poland between the world wars according to Jerzy Jan Lerski. It antagonized not only Jews, but also many Poles. Jewish students protested these policies, along with some Poles who supported them by standing instead of sitting. The segregation continued until the invasion of Poland in World War II. Poland's occupation by Nazi Germany suppressed the entire Polish educational system. In the eastern half of Poland annexed by the Soviet Union, such discriminatory policies in education were lifted.

== Background ==
The percentage of Poland's Jewish population increased greatly during the Russian Civil War. Following Poland's return to independence, several hundred thousand Jews joined the already numerous Polish Jewish minority living predominantly in the cities. The new arrivals were the least assimilated of all European Jewish communities of that period. Jews formed the second largest minority after Ukrainians, of about 10 percent of the total population of the Polish Second Republic. Jewish representation in the institutions of higher learning began to increase already during World War I. By the early 1920s, Jewish students constituted over one-third of all students attending Polish universities. The difficult situation in the private sector, compounded by the Great Depression, led to a massive enrollment in universities. In 1923, Jewish students constituted 63 percent of all students of stomatology, 34 percent of medical sciences, 29 percent of philosophy, 25 percent of chemistry and 22 percent of law (26 percent by 1929) at all Polish universities. Anger over their numbers, which remained out of proportion with that of the mostly gentile population of Poland during the Interbellum, contributed to a backlash.

Proposals to reinstitute the numerus clausus, which would restrict Jewish enrollment to 10 percent of the student body (roughly the percentage of Jews living in Poland), were made as early as 1923. However, the proposals were rejected as they would have violated the Little Treaty of Versailles. In spite of these earlier objections, Poland later renounced the Treaty in 1934. Polish nationalism and hostility towards minorities, particularly Jews, increased. Discriminatory policies regarding Jews in education in Poland continued the practice of the Russian Empire's numerus clausus policy, implemented by the Empire during Poland's partitions, which restricted, by means of quotas, the participation of Jews in public life. Issues that had earlier been resolved by the Russian Empire were now decided locally, uniting the Poles while dividing the nation as a whole.

Various means of limiting the number of Jewish students were adopted, seeking to reduce the Jewish role in Poland's economic and social life. The situation of Jews improved under Józef Piłsudski, but after his death in 1935 the National Democrats regained much of their power and the status of Jewish students deteriorated. A student "Green Ribbon" League was organized in 1931; its members distributed antisemitic material and called for the boycott of Jewish businesses and the enforcement of the numerus clausus. In 1934 a group of rabbis petitioned the Archbishop of Warsaw, Aleksander Kakowski, to stop the "youthful outbursts"; Kakowski responded that the incidents were regrettable, but also claimed that Jewish newspapers were "infecting public culture with atheism."

Agitation against Jewish students intensified during the economic recession of the 1930s and afterwards, as unemployment began to affect the Polish intellectual strata. There were growing demands to decrease the number of Jews in science and business so that Christian Poles could fill their positions. In November 1931, violence accompanied demands to reduce the number of Jewish students at several Polish universities. The universities' autonomous status contributed to this, as university rectors tended not to call in police to protect Jewish students from attacks on the campuses, and no action was taken against students involved in anti-Jewish violence.

== Attempts to legalize segregated seating ==
In 1935, students associated with National Democracy and the National Radical Camp, influenced by the Nazi Nuremberg Laws, demanded segregation of Jews into separate sections in the classrooms, known as "ghetto benches." The majority of Jewish students refused to accept this system of seating, considering it to be a violation of their civil rights. At some universities Polish students even attempted to forcibly move Jews to the ghetto benches.

Following Piłsudski's death in 1935, anti-Jewish riots broke out at the University of Warsaw and the Warsaw Polytechnic. The violence spread from the campuses to the streets of Warsaw. Subsequently, violence broke out at other universities in Poland as well. The student riots and violence were however mutual. Especially Jewish students from Academic Zionist Association "Kadimah" (Akademicki Związek Syjonistyczny "Kadimah") were involved in violence against Polish students. An uninterrupted wave of anti-Jewish violence eventually led to the temporary closure of all of Warsaw's institutions of higher education in November 1935. The National Democracy press put the blame for the riots on Jews refusing to comply with special seating arrangements set by Polish students.

== Introduction of ghetto benches ==
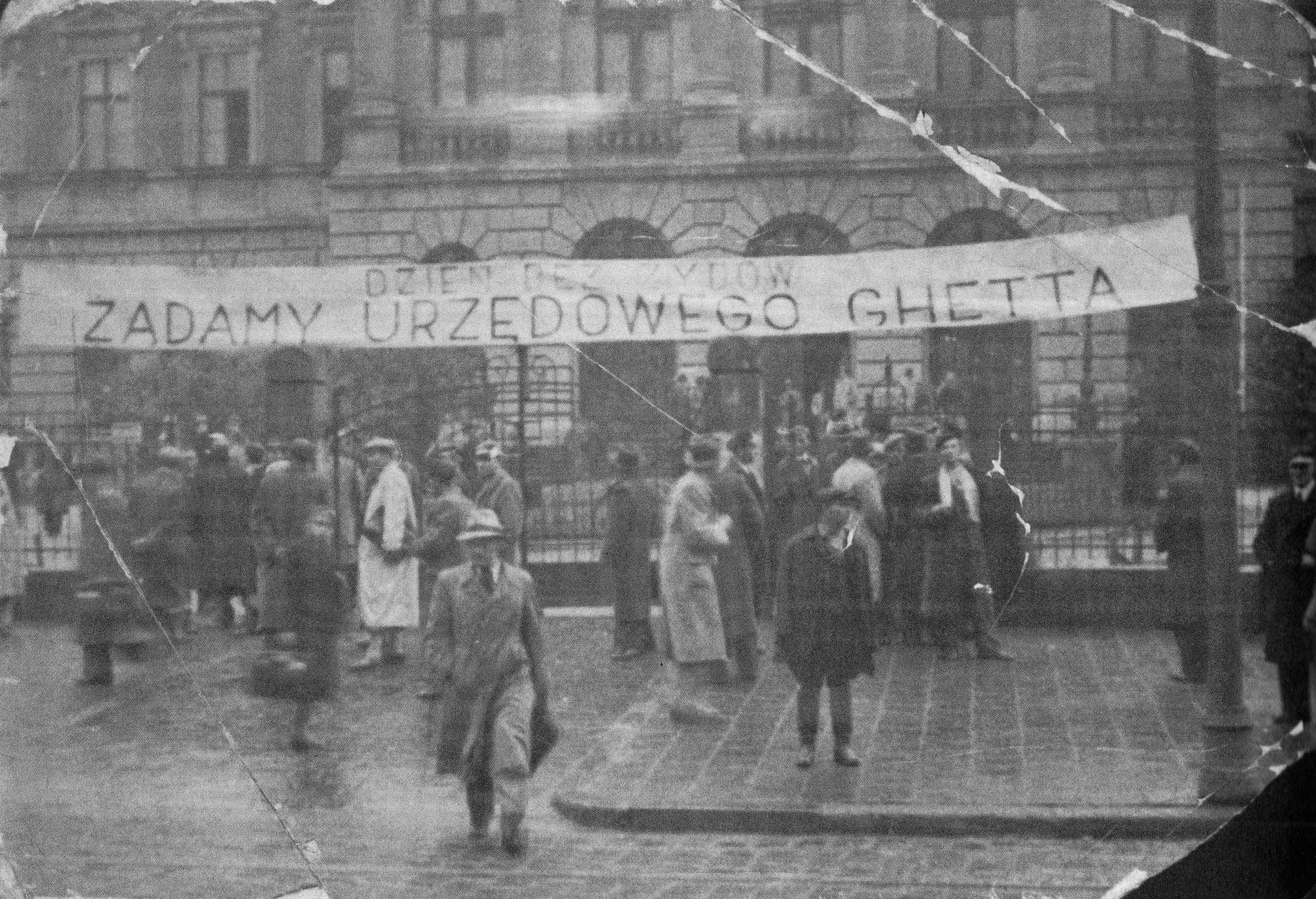
Demonstration of Polish students demanding implementation of ghetto benches at Lwów Polytechnic in 1930s.

While the Polish government initially opposed the segregation policies, the universities enjoyed a significant level of autonomy and were able to impose their local regulations. Ghetto benches were officially sanctioned for the first time in December 1935 at the Lwów Polytechnic. Following several violent attacks against the Jewish students, school officials ordered that they sit in separate sections, under threat of expulsion. Penalties were imposed on those who stayed away from classes in protest against segregated seating. The move to legalize ghetto benches was contested by the Jewish community, which saw it as a dangerous precedent. Ghetto benches were criticized by Jewish members of the Sejm. In January 1936, a delegation of representatives of the Jewish community of Lwów met with Poland's Education Minister, who promised to discuss the issue with school administrations, and in February 1936 the ghetto-bench order was cancelled by the Lwów Polytechnic's academic senate.

This setback for the segregationist cause did not stop attempts to establish ghetto benches in other Polish universities. Demands for segregated seating were again raised by the OZON-led Union of Young Poland (Związek Młodej Polski), the ND All-Polish Youth, and other nationalist youth organizations. The Ministry of Education in Warsaw was opposed to the ghetto benches, declaring numerus clausus a violation of the constitution, and the Polish Minister of Education stated that: "Student ghettos would not be introduced at the Polish Universities." However, in light of the continuing serious riots at the university, which the Ministry condemned as "zoological patriotism," the Ministry slowly gave in and decided to withdraw its opposition, hoping that the introduction of the ghettos would end the riots. The ethno-nationalists finally won their campaign for ghetto benches in 1937 when by Ministry decision universities were granted the right to regulate the seating of Polish and Jewish students. On October 5, 1937, the Rector of Warsaw Polytechnic ordered the establishment of the institution of ghetto benches in the lecture halls. Within a few days, similar orders were given in other universities of Poland.

Over 50 notable Polish professors (including Marceli Handelsman, Stanisław Ossowski, Tadeusz Kotarbiński, and Manfred Kridl) criticized the introduction of the ghetto benches, and refused to enforce either a quota, or the ghetto bench system, but their voices were ignored together with those gentile students who objected to the policy; they would protest by standing in class, and refusing to sit down. Rector Władysław Marian Jakowicki of the Stefan Batory University in Wilno (Vilnius) resigned from his position in protest of the introduction of the benches. Another rector who refused to establish ghetto benches in his university was Prof. Stanisław Kulczyński of Lwów University. Facing the decision to sign the order introducing segregated seating, Prof. Kulczyński resigned from his position instead of signing it. Nevertheless, the instruction ordering special "mandatory seats" for all Jewish students still was issued by the vice-rector of Lwów University the next morning. The only faculty in Poland that did not have ghetto benches introduced was that of the Children's Clinic in the Piłsudski University of Warsaw led by Professor Mieczysław Michałowicz, who refused to obey the Rector's order. Some fifty-six professors of universities in Warsaw, Poznań, and Wilno signed a protest against the Ghetto benches in December 1937. The list included the "elite of Polish scholarship," such as Tadeusz Kotarbiński; sociologists Józef Chałasiński, Stanisław, Maria Ossowska and Jan Stanisław Bystroń; biologists Stanisław Kulczyński and Jan Dembowski; psychologist Władysław Witwicki; physicist Konstanty Zakrzewski; as well as historians Seweryn Wysłouch and Tadeusz Manteuffel.

The introduction of ghetto benches was criticized internationally by the Anglophonic nations. Over 300 British professors signed an anti-ghetto bench manifesto. In New York, the League for Academic Freedom published an open letter signed by 202 professors condemning ghetto benches as "alien to the spirit of academic freedom."

Despite the arguments by Sanacja government that introduction of ghetto benches would stop the disturbances, the clashes between Jewish and gentile youth resulted in two fatalities among the Jewish students, and further assaults, or even an assassination attempt on Polish professor Konrad Górski critical of the segregation policies.

== Aftermath ==
The ghetto bench system and other anti-Semitic demonstrations of the segment of student youth inspired vengeance among some Jewish students of Lwów Polytechnic upon the arrival of the Soviet authorities, following the Soviet invasion of Poland.

The practice of segregated seating for the Jewish students in Poland ended with the demise of the Polish state in the beginning of the Second World War, after which most Polish educational institutions were shut down (see Education in Poland during World War II) although Lwów Polytechnic remained. Most Polish Jews ultimately perished during the German occupation of Poland and the Holocaust.

== See also ==
- Disabilities (Jewish)
- Jewish quota
- Racism in Poland
- Universities and antisemitism
