= Petrusevičius =

Petrusevičius is the Lithuanian-language form of the Polish surname Petrusewicz. Feminine forms: Petruševičienė (surname by husband), Petrusevičiūtė (maiden name).

Notable people with the surname include:

- Algirdas Petrusevičius (born 1937), Lithuanian politician
