= Władysław Marian Jakowicki =

Władysław Maria Jakowicki
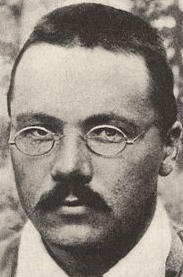
- Władysław Maria Jakowicki (1885 – after 1940), chief physician of the Polish Legions
- Born: September 19, 1885, Vitebsk, Russian Empire
- Died: ca 1940/1942; Soviet Union

Władysław Maria Jakowicki (1885 – ca.1940/1942) was a Polish soldier, physician and an academic. Professor and rector of the Stefan Batory University in Wilno (Vilnius). Arrested, imprisoned and died in the aftermath of the Soviet invasion of Poland (around 1940-1942), exact location and place of death unknown.

== Biography ==
Władysław Maria Jakowicki was born on 19 September 1885 in Vitebsk. In 1903 he finished a gymnasium there, and for the next three years he studied medicine at the University of Moscow. After the 1905 Russian Revolution he transferred to Lviv (Lwów) University, where in 1910 he received the physician qualification. Next year he received confirmation of his diploma from the Kiev University. From that time till the First World War he was an assistant in the obstetrics and gynaecology clinic of the Lviv University.

After the start of the war he joined volunteer units under Józef Piłsudski. From December 1914 he was the physician of the I baon of the 1st Infantry Regiment of the Polish Legions. On 1 January 1915 he was promoted to junior lieutenant, and on 26 January he became the chief physician of the 1st Regiment. He remained on that post till 25 April 1917, through the entire history of the 1st Regiment, advancing to the captain rank (1 October 1916). He was dismissed from the Legions after the Oath Crisis incident. He returned to Lviv, resuming his former position.

Throughout his military career he was awarded the Silver Cross of Virtuti Militari, as well as Cross of Valour (twice).

In the aftermath of World War I Lviv was incorporated into the newly independent Second Polish Republic. Jakowicki joined the new Polish Army. In December 1918 he was assigned to the director (ordinator) of the surgical department of the Military Hospital in Chełm. On 1 April 1920 he was promoted to deputy colonel. On 18 March 1921 upon request he was dismissed from active service. In 1923 he received habilitation of his degree. In 1924 he was an officer of the reserve in the 9th Hospital Regiment, from 1920 to 1924 working in the obstetrics clinic of the Warsaw University. On 1 October 1925 he became the chair of the obstetrics and gynaecology department (katedra) of the Stefan Batory University in Vilnius (Wilno). From 1929 to 1939 he was the dean of the medical department, and from 1936 to 1937, rector of the university. He resigned his position as the rector due to anti-Semitic incidents at the university, in protest over the introduction of the ghetto benches system.

He was a member of many scientific societies, such as the Lviv, Warsaw and Vilnius Medical Associations. He has served as president in some of them. He was one of the editors of the Ginekologia Polska (Polish Gynaecology) journal in the years 1924-1925 and has authored numerous scientific publications.

After the German and Soviet invasion of Poland in 1939, Vilnius was occupied and annexed by the Soviet Union. Around 25 September 1939 Jakowicki was arrested by the NKVD and transferred from Vilnius to a prison in Minsk. He was sentenced for 10 years. It is presumed that he died somewhere in the Soviet Union around 1940 to 1942; exact location and circumstances of his death are unknown. Tomas Venclova wrote that he "vanished without a trace". He was one of the nineteen Polish faculty from the Stefan Batory University arrested by the Soviets and one of their nine fatalities (see Soviet repressions of Polish citizens (1939–1946)).
