= Stefania Jabłońska =

Polish dermatologist

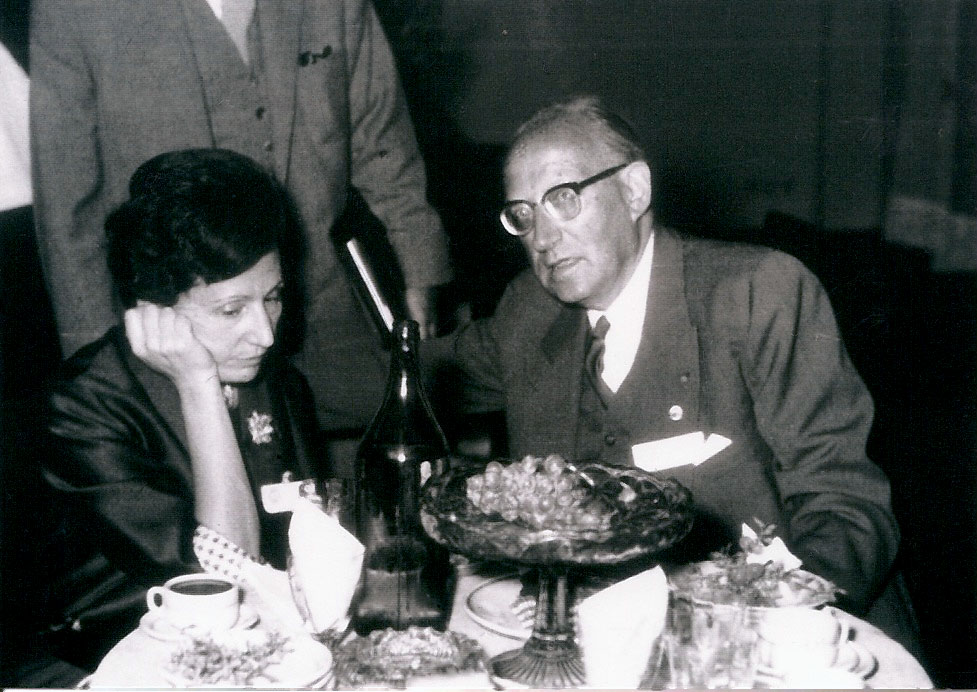
- Stefania Jabłońska with Alfred Marchionini
- Born: Szela Ginzburg; 7 September 1920; Mogilev, Soviet Union
- Died: 8 May 2017 (aged 96)
- Education: Medical University of Warsaw; Lviv University; Kyrgyz Technical University
- Known for: Seminal contributions to medicine
- Awards: 1985 Robert Koch Prize
- Scientific career
- Fields: Medicine (Dermatology)
- Workplaces: Russian Academy of Sciences; University of Pennsylvania; Medical University of Warsaw

Stefania Jabłońska (born Szela Ginzburg; 7 September 1920 – 8 May 2017) was a Polish physician and professor specializing in dermatology. She worked at the Medical University of Warsaw.

In 1972, she theorized the association of human papilloma viruses with skin cancer in epidermodysplasia verruciformis.

In 1978, Jabłońska and Gerard Orth at the Pasteur Institute discovered HPV-5 in skin cancer. Jabłońska was awarded the 1985 Robert Koch Prize.

She was a recipient of the National Order of Merit and the Commander's Cross of the Order of Polonia Restituta.

== Biography ==
She was born as Szela Ginzburg in 1920 in Mogilev, present-day Belarus, and at the age of six moved to Warsaw. She was the sister of neurologist Irena Hausmanowa-Petrusewicz. Later known as Stefania Jabłońska, she earned her high school diploma in 1937 in Warsaw, where she began to study medicine in the same year at the Medical University of Warsaw. In 1938 she moved to the University of Lviv and a year later to Kyrgyz Technical University, where she graduated in 1942 with a medical degree. She then served two years in the military.

She specialized in dermatology, worked for a year at the Soviet Science Academy in the Department of Pathology, and in 1946 in the Department of Dermatology of the Medical University of Warsaw. With a grant from the World Health Organization in 1949, she spent a year at the University of Pennsylvania.

Jabłońska earned a Doctor of Science in 1950. In 1951 she qualified as a professor. Jabłońska was appointed to head dermatology at the Medical University of Warsaw in 1954. She became professor emeritus in 1990. She died on 8 May 2017, age 96.

== Awards and honors ==
A partial list of Jabłońska's honors and awards.

=== State decorations ===
Ribbon bar	Award or decoration	Country	Date	Place	Note
	National Order of Merit	France	1998		France's highest order of merit.
	Commander's Cross of the Order of Polonia Restituta	Poland	1991		One of Poland's highest orders.

=== Orders and awards ===
Award or decoration	Country	Date	Place	Note
Robert Koch Prize	Germany	1985		Awarded in recognition of outstanding contributions to medical science.

=== Membership ===
Honor/award	Location	Date	Notes
Membership in the Royal Academies for Science and the Arts of Belgium	Brussels, Belgium	1986	
Membership in the Committee on Immunology of the Polish Academy of Sciences	Warsaw, Poland	1986	
Membership in the Academy of Sciences Leopoldina	Halle, Germany	1964	
Membership in the committee of the International League of Dermatological Societies	(United Kingdom) London, UK	1964	First Pole elected.

=== Honorary ===
==== Non-dermatological ====
Honor/award	Location	Date	Notes
Honorary membership in the Royal Medical Society	Edinburgh, Scotland	1984	
Honorary membership in the College of Physicians of Philadelphia	Philadelphia, Pennsylvania, United States	1983	
Honorary membership in the American College of Rheumatology	Atlanta, Georgia, United States	1981	
Honorary membership in the Argentine Medical Association	Buenos Aires, Argentina	1972	

==== Dermatological ====
Honor / award	Location	Date	Notes
Honorary membership in the American Dermatological Association	United States	1964	
Honorary membership in the American Society for Investigative Dermatology	United States	1974	
Honorary membership in the Association des Dermatologistes et Syphilidologues de Langue Francaise	France	1964	
Honorary membership in the Argentinian Dermatological Association	Argentina	1980	
Honorary membership in the Austrian Dermatological Association	Austria	1959	
Honorary membership in the Belgium Dermatological Association	Belgium	1966	
Honorary membership in the Berlin Dermatological Association	Germany	1956	
Honorary membership in the Brazilian Dermatological Association	Brazil	1965	
Honorary membership in the British Dermatological Association	United Kingdom	1958	
Honorary membership in the Bulgarian Dermatological Association	Bulgaria	1964	
Honorary membership in the Canadian Dermatological Association	Canada	1984	
Honorary membership in the Danish Dermatological Association	Denmark	1964	
Honorary membership in the Finnish Dermatological Association	Finland	1966	
Honorary membership in the French Dermatological Association	France	1964	
Honorary membership in the German Dermatological Association	Germany	1962	
Honorary membership in the Georgian Dermatological Association	(Georgia (country)) Georgia	1974	
Honorary membership in the Greek Dermatological Association	Greece	1964	
Honorary membership in the Hungarian Dermatological Association	Hungary	1969	
Honorary membership in the Indian Dermatological Association	India	1969	
Honorary membership in the International Society of Tropical Dermatology		1982	
Honorary membership in the Israel Dermatological Association	Israel	1960	
Honorary membership in the Italian Dermatological Association	Italy	1972	
Honorary membership in the Japanese Dermatological Association	Japan	1980	
Honorary membership in the Kiev Dermatological Association	Ukraine	1974	
Honorary membership in the Mexican Dermatological Association	Mexico	1978	
Honorary membership in the Mexican Academy of Dermatology	Mexico	1978	
Honorary membership in the Munich Dermatological Association	Germany	1959	
Honorary membership in the Norwegian Dermatological Association	Norway	1974	
Honorary membership in the Pacific Dermatological Association		1974	
Honorary membership in the Swedish Dermatological Association	Sweden	1971	
Honorary membership in the Styrian Dermatological Association	Austria	1978	
Honorary membership in the Tchekoslovak Dermatological Association	Czechoslovakia	1967	
Honorary membership in the Thuring Dermatological Association	Austria	1964	
Honorary membership in the Yugoslavian Dermatological Association	(Socialist Federal Republic of Yugoslavia) Yugoslavia	1957	
Honorary membership in the Venezuela Dermatological Association	Venezuela	1963	
