= Irena Hausmanowa-Petrusewicz =

Polish doctor and neurologist

Irena Hausmanowa-Petrusewicz, née Ginzburg (27 December 1917 – 7 July 2015) was a Polish doctor and neurologist who specialized in neuromuscular diseases.

She was a pioneer of myology and a founder of myology and electromyography in Poland.

She was born in Warsaw to a family which came from Lwow.

Her father was a literary critic and her mother was a dermatologist. Her sister was the dermatologist Stefania Jabłońska. Her husband Kazimierz Petrusewicz, was a biologist and politician.

== Awards ==
- Commander's Cross with Star of the Order of Polonia Restituta on the 50th anniversary of the Polish Academy of Sciences (2002)
- Commander's Cross of the Order of Polonia Restituta (1986)
- Officer's Cross of the Order of Polonia Restituta (22 July 1951, for outstanding scientific activity in the field of medicine )
- Silver Cross of Merit
- Medal of the National Education Commission (1985)
