= Kazimierz Petrusewicz =

Polish communist activist and biologist

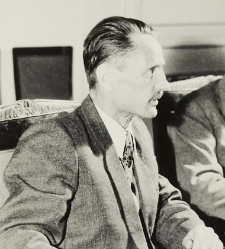

Kazimierz Petrusewicz (Polish pronunciation: [kaˈʑi.mjɛʂ pɛt.ruˈsɛ.vit͡ʂ]; 23 March 1906 in Minsk – 26 March 1982 in Warsaw) was a Polish communist activist, member of the Polish People's Republic government, biologist, full member of the Polish Academy of Sciences, professor at the University of Warsaw, member of the Polish Workers' Party/Polish United Workers' Party during 1944–1982.

In 1947 he was awarded the Commander's Cross of the Order of Polonia Restituta.

Petrusewicz was the son of socialist revolutionary Kazimierz Petrusewicz, Sr (1872–1949). He Graduated from the Maritime School and then Stefan Batory University in Vilnius. From 1931 to 1939 he worked as an assistant at Vilnius University. From 1931 a member of the Communist Union of Polish Youth, from 1935 a member of the Communist Party of Poland. He was a founding member "Po prostu" group with Stefan Jędrychowski and Henryk Dembiński. In Vilnius he earned a doctorate in biological sciences for his work on spider ecology.

In 1944 he was Deputy Head of the Economic Bureau of the Polish Committee of National Liberation. In 1944-45 he was Deputy Minister of Provisioning and 1945–49 of Navigation and from 1951 professor at the University of Warsaw.

From 1952 a corresponding member, from 1966 a full member of the Polish Academy of Sciences. Petrusewicz Organizer and head of the Institute of Ecology of the Polish Academy of Sciences in Dziekanów Leśny. He was an active propagator of Trofim Lysenko's theory, only stopping its propagation after 1960.

His wife was the neurologist Irena Hausmanowa-Petrusewicz.
