= Complete works =

Collection of all creative works of a person or group

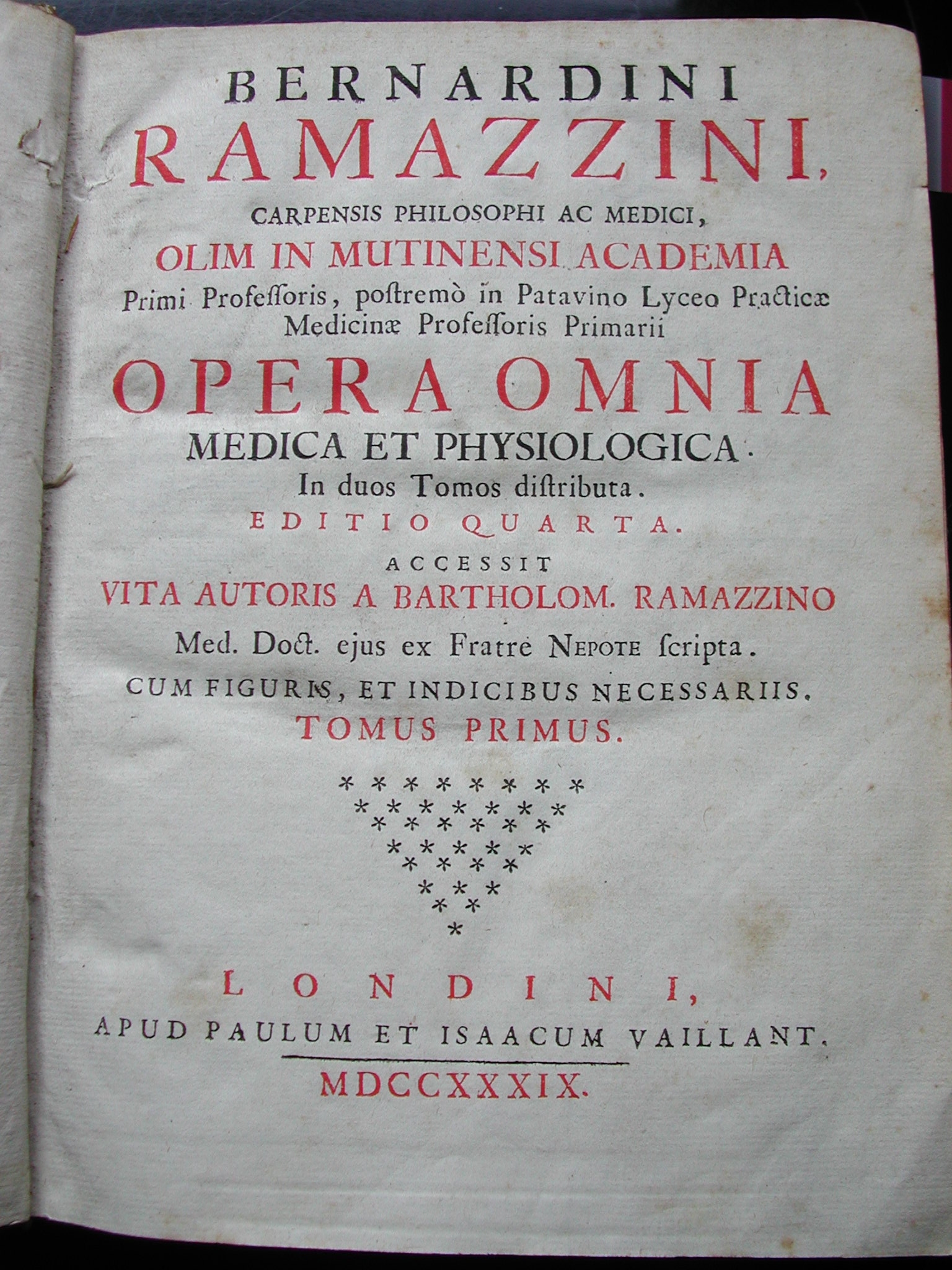
Title page from a 1739 volume of the Opera Omnia of Bernardino Ramazzini

The complete works of an artist, writer, musician, group, etc., is a collection of all of their cultural works. For example, Complete Works of Shakespeare is an edition containing all the plays and poems of William Shakespeare. A Complete Works published edition of a text corpus is normally accompanied with additional information and critical apparatus. It may include notes, introduction, a biographical sketch, and may pay attention to textual variants.

Similarly, the term body of work may be used to describe the entirety of the creative or academic output produced by a particular individual or unit.

== Terminology ==
Complete works may be titled by a single word, "Works". "Collected works" is often treated as a synonym. A distinction began to be seen clearly in the second half of the 18th century.

The Latin language equivalent Opera Omnia is still used in English, for example, to refer to the works of Galen or Leonhard Euler. German usage distinguishes de:Gesamtwerk as a complete corpus, de:Gesamtausgabe for a published edition of the works, and Gesammelte Werke or collected works that may be selective in some way. A contrasting term is "selected works", which is a collection of works chosen according to some criterion, e.g., by prominence, or as a representative selection.

== Examples ==
- The first literary author to have "complete works" published, in the modern sense, has been identified as Gerbrand Adriaenszoon Bredero, in 1637/8.
- The first critical complete edition of a musical composer's works has been identified as Joh. Seb. Bach's Werke (of Johann Sebastian Bach) published 1851 to 1926 by the Bach Gesellschaft at Leipzig, in 46 volumes.
- The Opera Omnia Leonhard Euler, a compilation of the works of the mathematician Leonhard Euler, began publication in 1911 and volumes were still being compiled for publication as of 2022.
- The Iwanami Shoten complete works of Natsume Sōseki, new edition, set up a Japanese model for complete works of other authors.
