= Mechanica =

Book by Leonhard Euler

Mechanica (Latin: Mechanica sive motus scientia analytice exposita; 1736) is a two-volume work published by mathematician Leonhard Euler which describes analytically the mathematics governing movement.

Euler both developed the techniques of analysis and applied them to numerous problems in mechanics, notably in later publications the calculus of variations. Euler's laws of motion expressed scientific laws of Galileo and Newton in terms of points in reference frames and coordinate systems making them useful for calculation when the statement of a problem or example is slightly changed from the original.

Newton–Euler equations express the dynamics of a rigid body. Euler has been credited with contributing to the rise of Newtonian mechanics especially in topics other than gravity.

== See also ==
- Contributions of Leonhard Euler to mathematics
