= Euler Committee of the Swiss Academy of Sciences =

The Euler Committee of the Swiss Academy of Sciences (also known as the Euler Committee or the Euler Commission) was founded in July 1907 with the objective of publishing the entire scientific production of Leonhard Euler in four series collectively called Opera Omnia (Collected Works in Latin).

The project represented a colossal challenge, as Euler is one of the most prolific scientists in history. The edition of Euler's Collected Works is close to completion, with a total of 84 volumes comprising about 35,000 pages planned for the entire collection. A total of 80 volumes have been published so far. By 2010, three of the last four volumes of series IV were in active preparation.

The considerable effort of editing and publishing Euler's Opera Omnia required the continuous contribution of internationally acclaimed scientists for over a century, as well as the financial support of the Swiss National Science Foundation, the Swiss Academy of Sciences and numerous donations from Swiss corporations.

== See also ==
- List of topics named after Leonhard Euler
