= Johann Friedrich Hennert =

German mathematician (1733–1813)

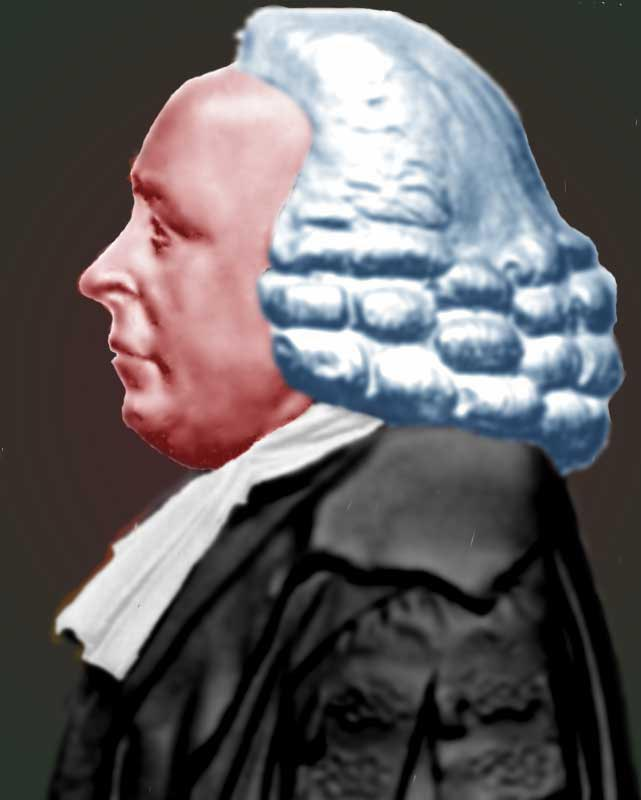
- Born: 19 October 1733; Berlin, Prussia
- Died: 30 March 1813 (aged 79); Utrecht, First French Empire
- Scientific career
- Fields: Mathematics; Physics
- Institutions: University of Utrecht
- Doctoral advisor: Leonhard Euler; Joseph-Nicolas Delisle
- Doctoral students: Jean Henri van Swinden

Johann Friedrich Hennert (19 October 1733 – 30 March 1813) was German-born and lectured in mathematics and physics at the University of Utrecht. He was a significant student of Leonhard Euler. He was known for his inclination towards the British school of philosophy.

In 1769, he married to the poet and scientist Petronella Johanna de Timmerman. In 1786 he wrote her biography and published her poems as Nagelaatene gedichten.

== Work ==
Hennert held the chair of mathematics at the University of Utrecht until 1805.

Hennert was an important figure in the history of Dutch mathematics. He wrote a number of textbooks on differential calculus.

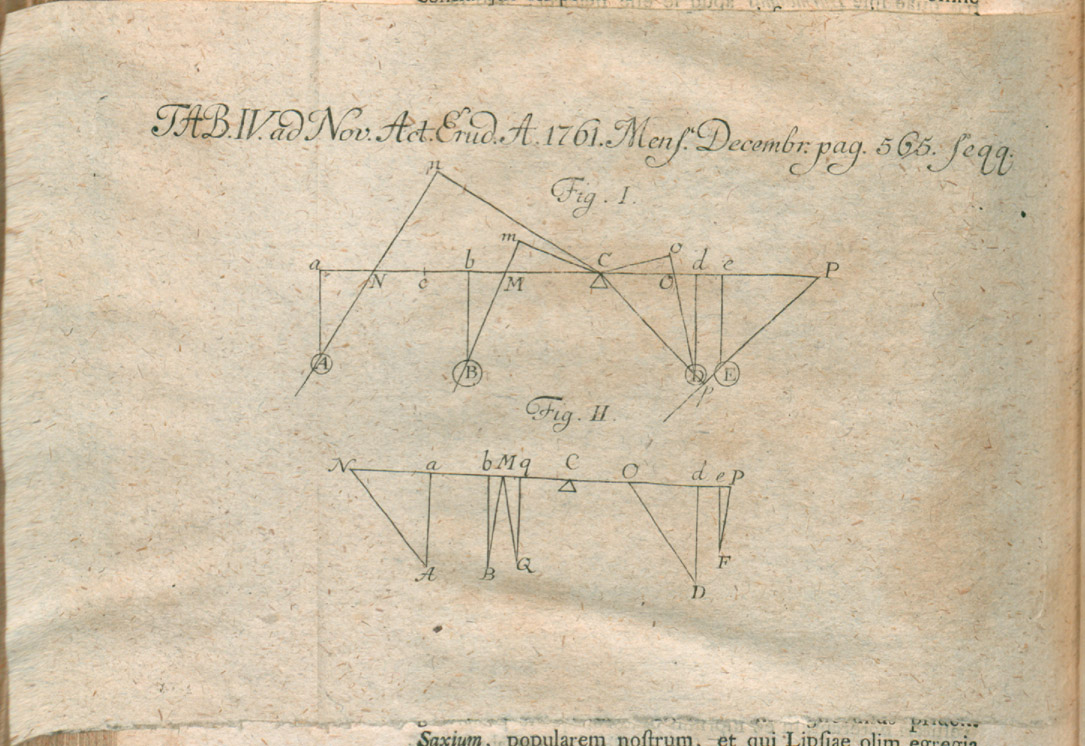
Illustration of Problemata de centro aequilibrii potentiarum obliquarum vecti adplicatarum. ... from Acta Eruditorum, 1761

Jean Henri van Swinden was one of his most important students.

== Sources ==
- van Berkel, Klaas; van Helden, Albert & Palm, L. C. (1998). A History of Science in the Netherlands: Survey, Themes and Reference. Leiden: Brill. ISBN 90-04-10006-7.
