= Georg Gsell =

Swiss artist

- Born: January 28, 1673; St. Gallen, Holy Roman Empire
- Died: November 22, 1740 (aged 67); Saint Petersburg, Russian Empire
- Known for: Painting, curation, illustration
- Notable work: Venus und Amor (1722); Icons for Peter and Paul Cathedral (1730–1732)
- Movement: Baroque
- Spouses: Marie Gertrud von Loen (m. 1697–1713); Anna Houtmans (m. 1714; divorce unverified); Dorothea Maria Hendriks, née Graff (marriage unverified)
- Children: 9, including Elisabeth Gsell, Katharina Gsell, Salome Abigail Gsell
- Patrons: Peter the Great

Georg Gsell (Russian: Георг Гзелль; 28 January 1673 – 22 November 1740) was a Swiss Baroque painter, art consultant and art dealer.

== Biography ==
=== Early life and training ===
He received his training until around 1695 in Vienna with the painter Antoon Schoonjans (1655–1726). After completing his training, he lived and worked from 1697 to 1704 in his birthplace, St. Gallen. In 1697 he married Marie Gertrud von Loen from Frankfurt am Main. The couple had five daughters, among them Elisabeth Gsell, born in 1699 in St. Gallen, who married the bibliographer and translator Isaac Le Long in Amsterdam in 1717, and Katherina Gsell, born in Amsterdam in 1707, who later became the first wife of the mathematician Leonhard Euler; the couple has numerous descendants who are well known today.

=== Career ===
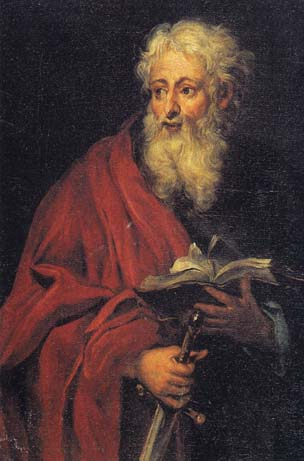

In 1704 Gsell moved to Amsterdam. During a visit by Tsar Peter I in the years 1716/1717 in Amsterdam, Gsell served as his art advisor. As a connoisseur of Dutch art, he advised Peter the Great on which paintings and other artworks he should purchase for the Peterhof Palace in Saint Petersburg. When Peter the Great returned to Russia, the Gsell–Merian couple entered his service.

In Saint Petersburg he worked with his wife first in the Kunstkamera, before being appointed curator of the imperial galleries in 1720. After the death of Peter the Great and his wife, Gsell taught painting and drawing from 1727 at the Russian Academy of Sciences in Saint Petersburg and illustrated several publications of the Academy; for example, he drew the internal organs of lions and fish.

Together with Andrei Matveyev (1701–1739), he painted seven of the eighteen icons on the upper part of the walls of the new Peter and Paul Cathedral from 1730 to 1732. He also painted portraits, genre scenes, still lifes of religious and mythological subjects, such as Venus and Cupid (1722, now in the Kunstmuseum Solothurn). Most of his works are located in Russia, four of them in the museums of Peterhof, where he himself had worked as curator.

=== Death ===
After Gsell’s death in 1740, aged 67, the family remained in Russia; several grandchildren and great‑grandchildren are known.

== Personal life ==
After the death of his first wife (13 May 1713), he married Anna Houtmans (or Horstmans) on 28 December 1714. Numerous literary sources report a divorce from this marriage on 15 June 1715, but there are no documents for this in the Amsterdam State Archive.

The same applies to a marriage with the widow Dorothea Maria Hendriks, née Graff (baptized in Nuremberg on 2 February 1678, died in Saint Petersburg on 5 May 1743), daughter of the naturalist and painter Maria Sibylla Merian and the Nuremberg still-life and architectural painter Johann Andreas Graff (the parents were divorced). Graff was also a painter, who had traveled for some time with her mother to Suriname, where she made drawings and paintings of the local flora and fauna. Like her mother, her interests focused mainly on flowers and insects. Gsell was already living on Kerkstraat before the marriage, possibly even in the house of Dorothea Maria’s mother, who had died in January 1717, in the building “Roozetak,” not far from Spiegelstraat; this is confirmed by the marriage entry of Gsell’s daughter Anna in January 1717. The couple had four children in Saint Petersburg. The youngest daughter, Salome Abigail, became the second wife of the mathematician Leonhard Euler in 1776, after his first wife, her half‑sister (see above), had died in 1773.

== Works ==
- Otto Gsell: Georg Gsell (1673–1749), Hofmaler Peters des Grossen (Courtpainter of Peter the Great)
- Renate Treydel: “Gsell, Georg.” In: Allgemeines Künstlerlexikon. Die Bildenden Künstler aller Zeiten und Völker (AKL), vol. 64, Saur, Munich et al., 2009, ISBN 978-3-598-23031-8, p. 39.

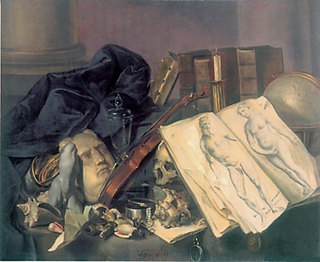
Still life
