= Institutiones calculi differentialis =

Mathematical work by Leonhard Euler

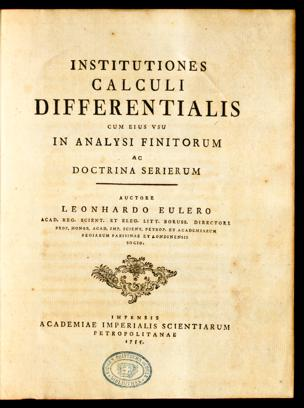
Institutiones calculi differentialis

Institutiones calculi differentialis (Foundations of differential calculus) is a mathematical work written in 1748 by Leonhard Euler and published in 1755. It lays the groundwork for the differential calculus. It consists of a single volume containing two internal books; there are 9 chapters in book I, and 18 in book II.

W. W. Rouse Ball (1888) writes that "this is the first textbook on the differential calculus which has any claim to be both complete and accurate, and it may be said that all modern treatises on the subject are based on it."

== See also ==
- Institutiones calculi integralis
- List of important publications in mathematics

== See also ==
- Contributions of Leonhard Euler to mathematics
