= Petronella Johanna de Timmerman =

Dutch poet and scientist

Petronella Johanna de Timmerman (31 January 1723, in Middelburg – 2 May 1786, in Utrecht) was a Dutch poet and scientist.

Her first publication, a poem about astronomy, was published in 1746, three years before she married Abraham Haverkamp.

After Abraham's death in 1758, she remarried in 1769 to Johann Friedrich Hennert, professor of mathematics, astronomy and philosophy. During her second marriage, she conducted scientific experiments and studied physics with her spouse. She was inducted as an honorary member of the academy ‘Kunstliefde Spaart Geen Vlijt’ in 1774. She presented the academy with poems, translated French plays and planned to write a book about physics for women.

She suffered a stroke in 1776 and wrote no more poetry. Her widower wrote a biography about her and published her poems.
