= Stepan Rumovsky =

Russian astronomer (1734–1812)

Stepan Yakovlevich Rumovsky
- Степан Яковлевич Румовский
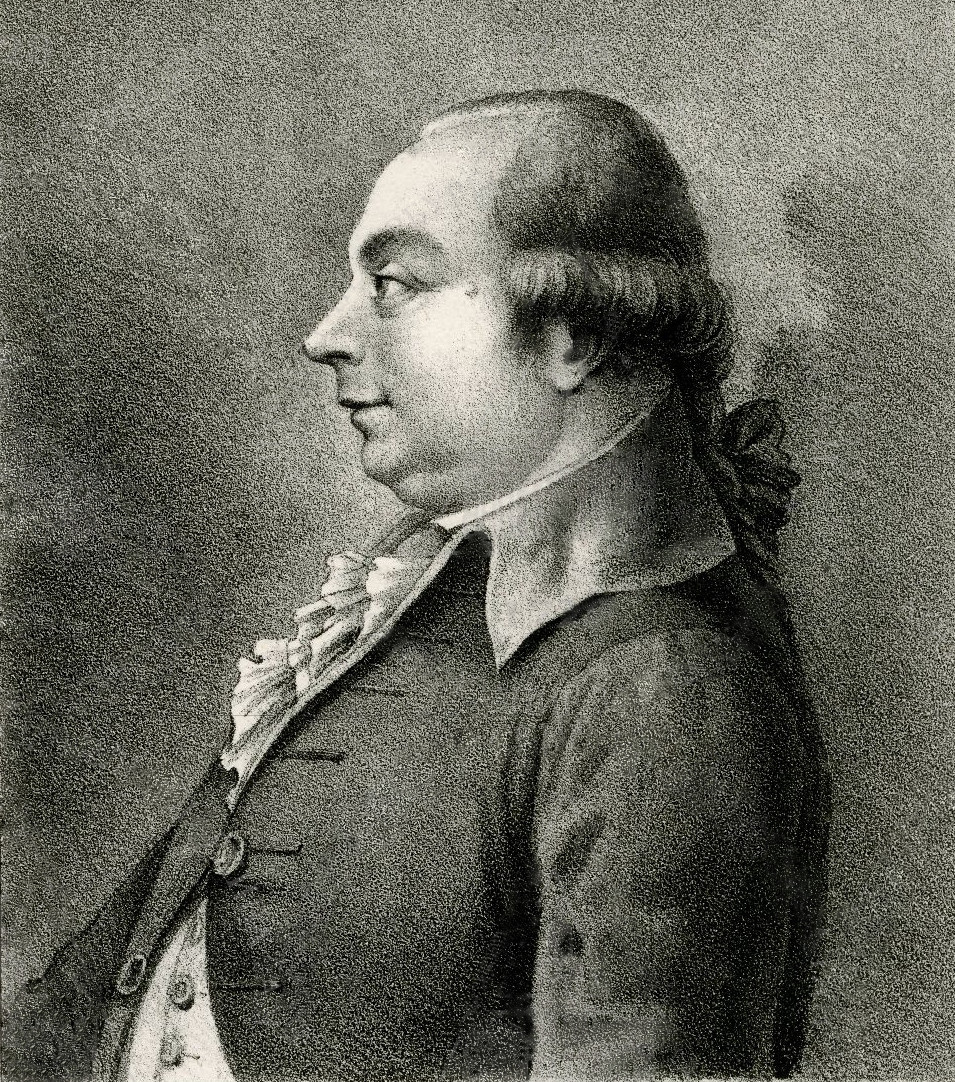
- Born: 9 November [O.S. 29 October] 1734; Vladimir, Russia
- Died: 6 July [O.S. 18 July] 1812; Saint Petersburg, Russia
- Education: Studied under Leonhard Euler in Berlin
- Occupations: Astronomer; mathematician
- Years active: 1756–1812

Stepan Yakovlevich Rumovsky (Russian: Степан Яковлевич Румовский; 9 November [O.S. 29 October] 1734, Vladimir Governorate – 6 July [O.S. 18 July] 1812, Saint Petersburg) was a Russian astronomer and mathematician, considered to be the first Russian astronomer of renown.

== Biography ==
Rumovsky studied in Berlin under Leonhard Euler. He taught mathematics and astronomy at the University of St. Petersburg from 1756 to 1812 and held numerous important positions in the St. Petersburg Academy, including director of the geography department from 1766 to 1786 and director of the observatory and professor of astronomy from 1763 until his death. At some point, he became a vice-president of the Academy of Sciences. He was appointed an honorary foreign member of the Swedish Academy of Sciences in 1763.

Rumovsky joined the Russian School Administration Board in 1803 and was responsible for several reforms. As superintendent of the Kazan Department of Education between 1803 and 1812 he played a major role in the founding of Kazan University.

== Works ==
He authored scientific papers related to the field of astronomy, geodesy, geography, mathematics, and physics. In 1786, he was responsible for publishing the first catalog in Russia with astronomical geographical coordinates for sixty-two sites, later republished in Berliner Astronomisches Jahrbuch (1790). In 1760, Rumovsky published a textbook on mathematics for students. Later, he was involved in the edition of the Dictionary of the Russian language. He made a number of translations into Russian as well, mostly philosophical works.

=== Observations of Venus ===
In the 18th century, the precise measurements of the distance between the Earth and the Sun were recognized as one of the most urgent tasks of astronomy. It was previously suggested by Edmond Halley that the best available method to measure this distance was to observe the point at which Venus was between the Sun and the Earth (transit of Venus). Two such points occurred in 1761 and 1769, respectively, and the observations, performed everywhere over Europe, lead indeed to a very precise data related to the distance to the Sun.

In 1761, the effort was coordinated all over Europe, including Russia. The Russian effort, backed by Mikhail Lomonosov, consisted in a number of expeditions to observe the phenomenon. In particular, Rumovsky headed the expedition to Selenginsk in Siberia.

The 1761 results were used for more refined observations performed in 1769. In that year, Rumovsky was coordinating the observations in the Russian Empire, which were held over the whole accessible area. Rumovsky personally conducted observations in Kola, and later collaborated with Euler to produce the most complete picture based on the observations made in all possible locations.
