= Institutiones calculi integralis =

1768 textbook by Leonhard Euler

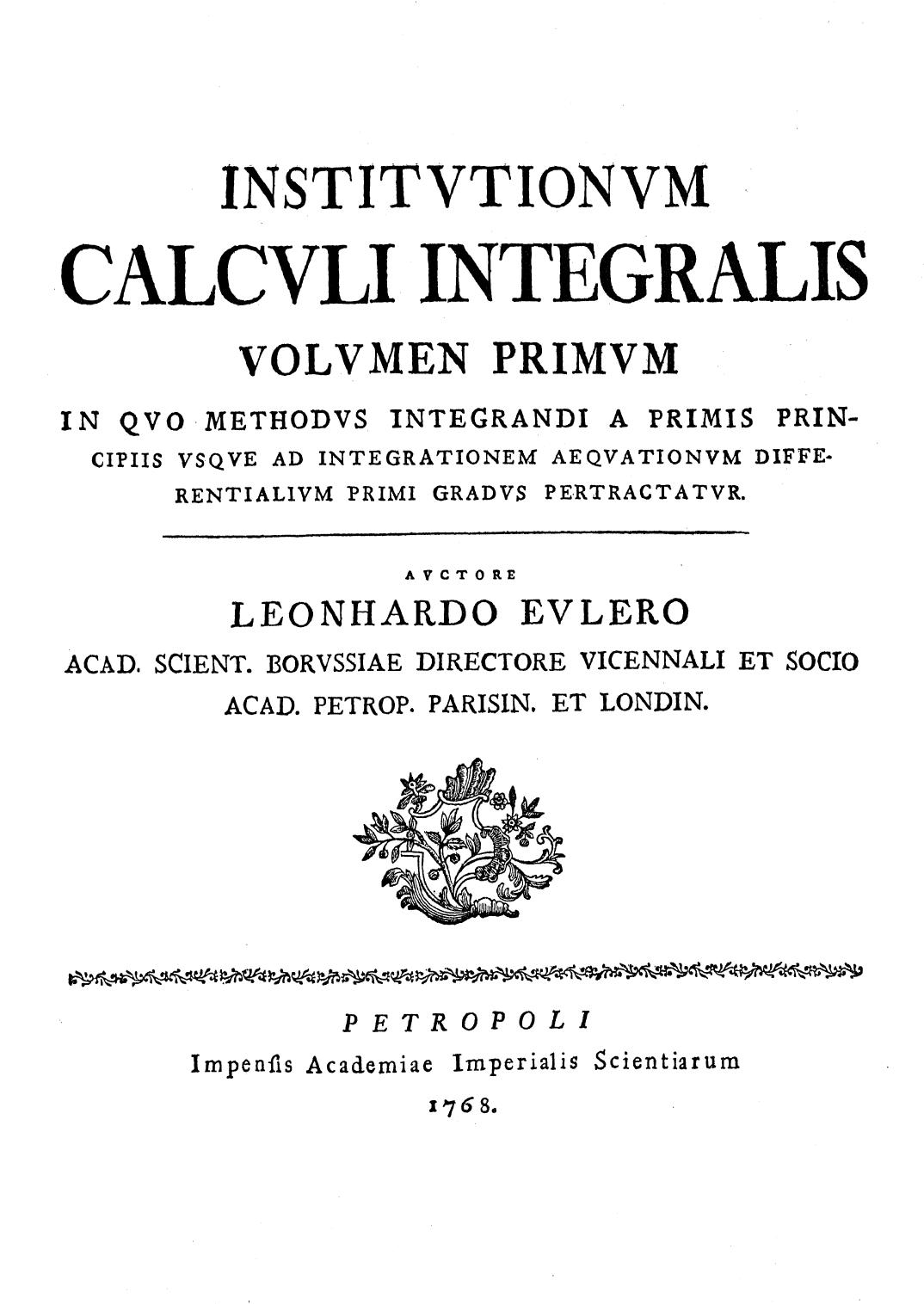
Scan of the first page of Institutiones calculi integralis, Vol. 1

Institutiones calculi integralis (Foundations of integral calculus) is a three-volume textbook written by Leonhard Euler and published in 1768. It was on the subject of integral calculus and contained many of Euler's discoveries about differential equations. It was written after "Institutiones calculi differentialis" (1755) and "Introductio in analysin infinitorum" (1748)

== See also ==
- Institutiones calculi differentialis
- Contributions of Leonhard Euler to mathematics
