= Opera Omnia Leonhard Euler =

Ongoing project compiling Leonhard Euler's scientific writings

- Author: Leonhard Euler
- Original title: Opera Omnia Leonhard Euler, Series I, Volume 1
- Language: German, French, Latin
- Genre: Non-fiction
- Publisher: B. G. Teubner- Verlag, Leipzig - Berlin
- Publication date: 1911
- Media type: Print
- Pages: 748

Opera Omnia Leonhard Euler (Leonhardi Euleri Opera omnia) is the compilation of Leonhard Euler's scientific writings. The project of this compilation was undertaken by the Euler Committee of the Swiss Academy of Sciences, established in 1908, and is ongoing as of September 2022. The Committee decided on "the edition of the Collected Works of Leonhard Euler in the original languages, convinced of rendering the entire scientific world a service thereby", and, in 1919, it indicated to collect “All works from Leonhard Euler, hitherto unseen or already printed, coming from St Petersburg or elsewhere need to be integrated. This also includes the scientific letters of Euler”. The project has been supported by the international community, notably the Petersburg Academy of Sciences where Euler taught and which lent out its Euler materials in 1910. Publishing Euler's Opera Omnia has been termed "one of the most extraordinary projects in publishing".

The Opera Omnia, excepting correspondences still being compiled in IVA9, was made available online in 2022 via the Opera-Bernoulli-Euler, which is working to make "the entire work of Euler, the Bernoulli family and their environment" freely available online.

== Euler's writings ==
During his life, Euler published about 560 writings. After his death in 1783, the Petersburg Academy published more of his manuscripts until 1830, increasing his number of publications to 756. Additional manuscripts were found later by his grandson Paul-Heinrich Fuss and published. Gustav Eneström established an inventory – the Eneström Index – between 1910 and 1913 listing 866 publications, namely E1–E866. Euler's writings are primarily in Latin, French, and German, though some are also in Russian and English. Previous attempts to compile all of Euler's writing had been made prior to the work of the Euler Committee.

The committee has been publishing the 866 publications of Euler's work since 1911. The work was delayed by two world wars and economic issues. In the second part of the 20th century, it became more difficult to find qualified editors who could work with the Latin texts and German Kurrent handwriting. Recent editions contain more extensive footnotes. In 2005, the Committee decided that the final volumes would be digitalized rather than printed, and that, eventually, the whole Opera Omnia would be online for easy access. The Opera-Bernoulli-Euler, begun in 2022, included the Opera Omnia, as well as the works of the Bernoulli family and other contemporary scientists. The Opera-Bernoulli-Euler project also planned to retrodigitize the already published content from the Opera Omnia and link it with the Eneström index so it would be easily accessible and searchable.

== Series I - IV ==
In 2018, the Committee indicated that 76 of 81 volumes had been published in four series: Earlier, it was planned to consist of 84 volumes with about 35,000 pages. As of September 2022, 80 of the 81 volumes have been completed with IVA9, the last volume of Euler's correspondence, being prepared for publication.

- Series I: Opera mathematica (Mathematics), 29 volumes, completed.
- Series II: Opera mechanica et astronomica (Mechanics and Astronomy), 31 volumes, completed.
- Series III: Opera physica, Miscellanea (Physics and Miscellaneous), 12 volumes, completed.
- Series IVA: Commercium epistolicum (Correspondence), 9 volumes

Volume IVA/9 is the last volume to be published. Additional scientific correspondences will be made available online.

- Series IVB: Manuscripts, to be published online.

== Major collaborating institutions ==
- Swiss National Science Foundation
- Petersburg Academy of Sciences, later Academy of Sciences of the Soviet Union, since 1991 Russian Academy of Sciences, Saint Petersburg, Russia
- University of Basel, Basel, Switzerland
