= List of tallest buildings in the Baltic states =

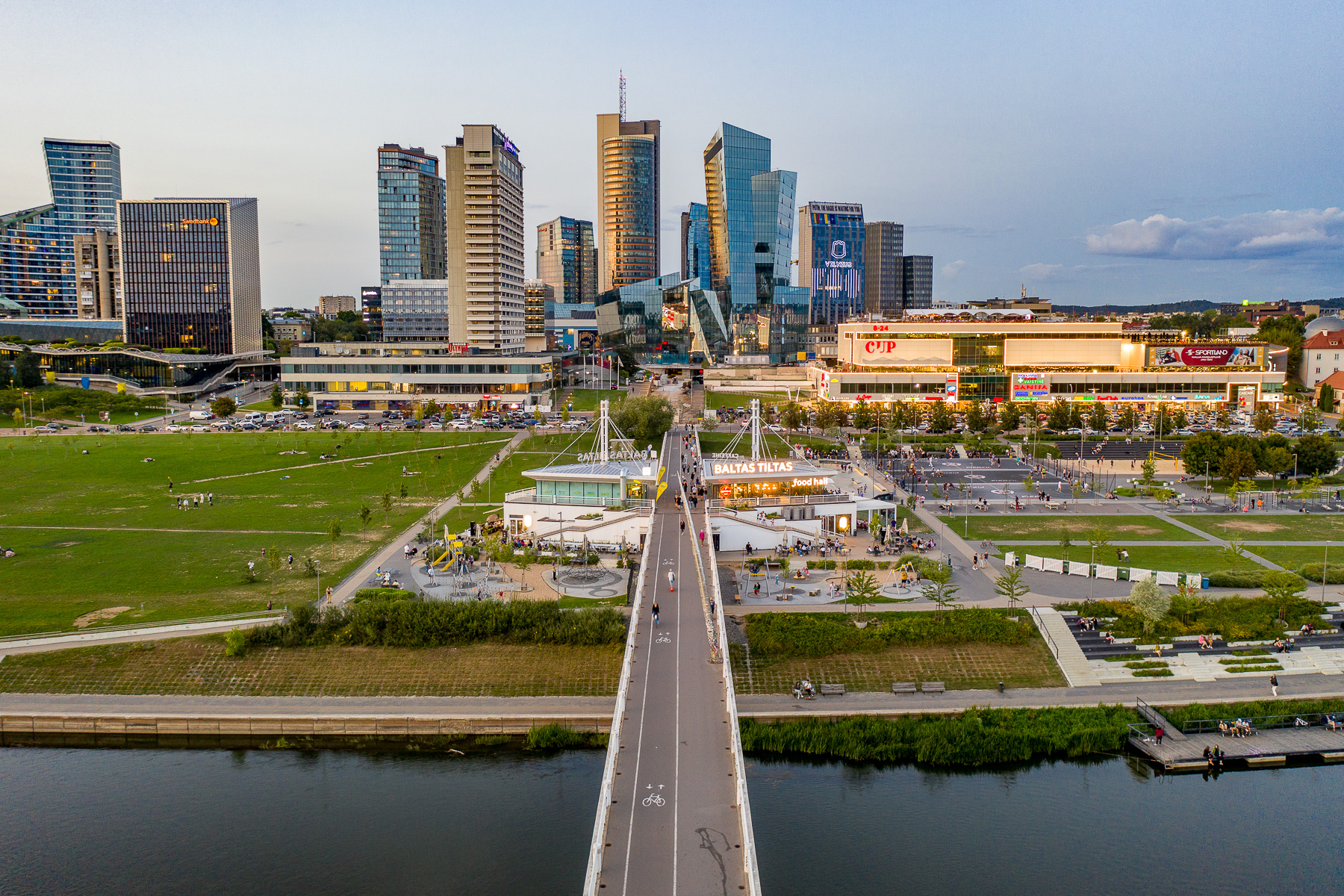
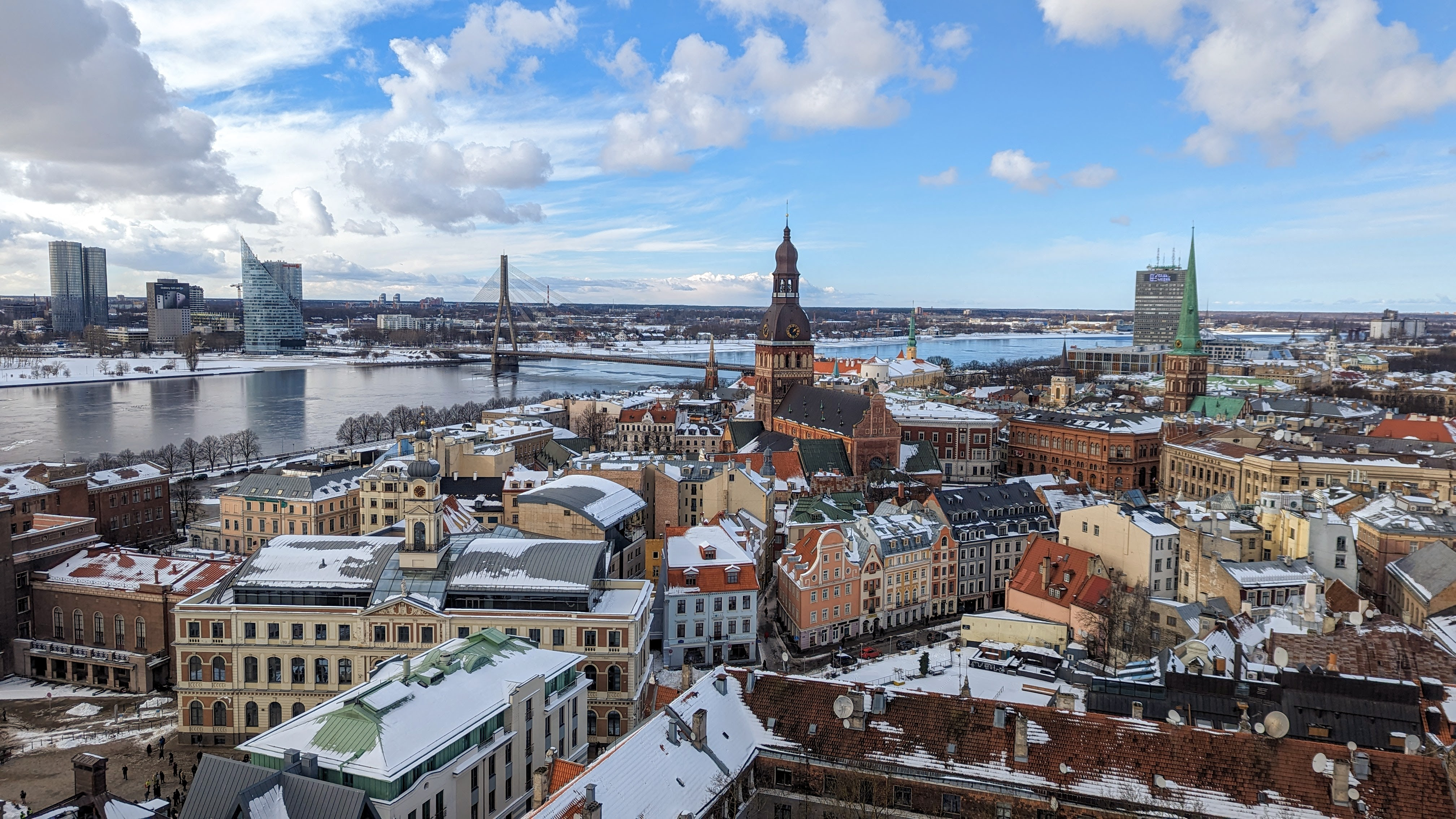
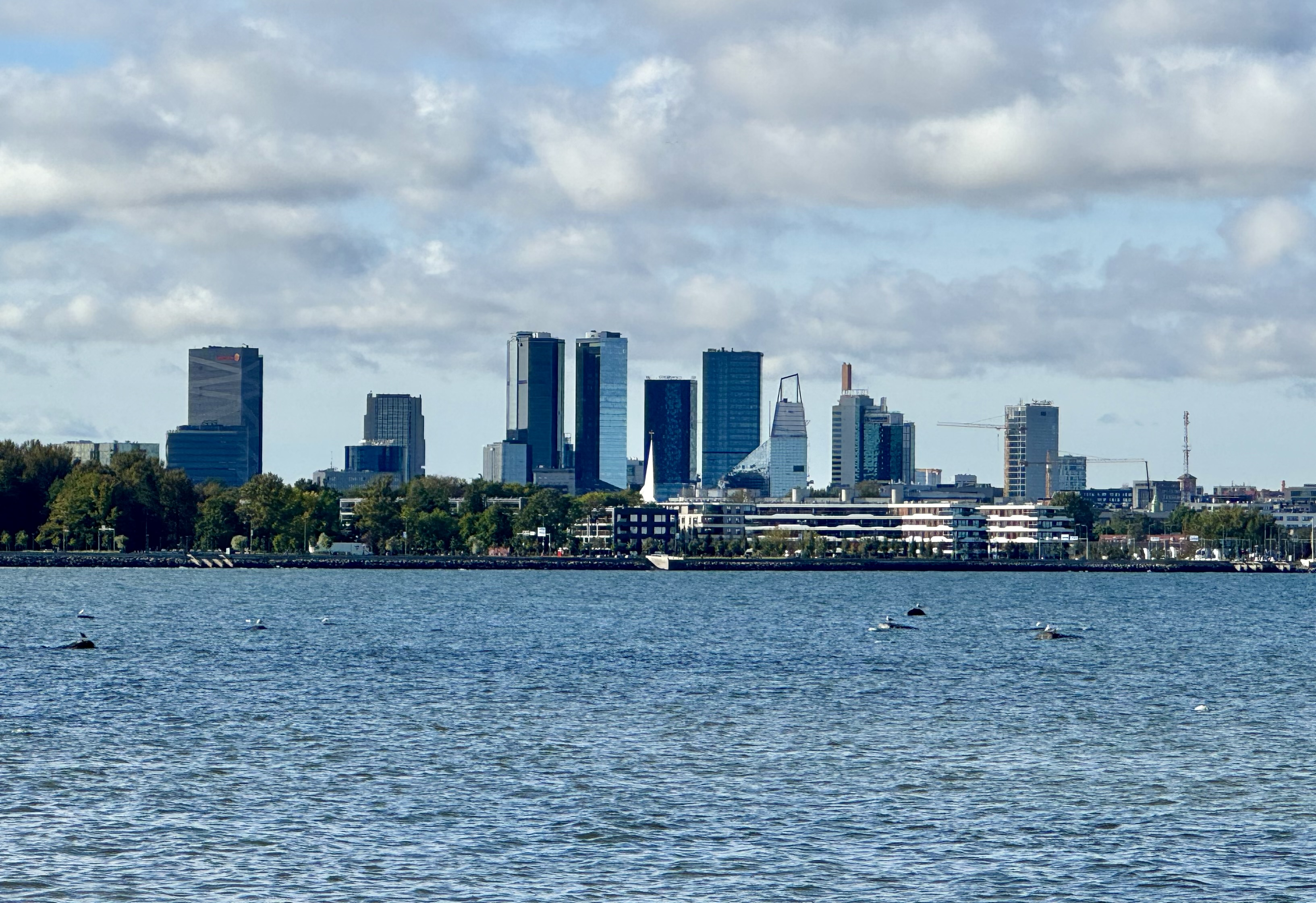
Skylines in Vilnius, Riga, and Tallinn.

This is a list of tallest buildings in the Baltic States, which includes all the buildings in Estonia, Latvia, and Lithuania with heights that exceeds 67 metres+1cm (220 ft). TV towers and chimneys are excluded in the height measurement. There are 43 Lithuanian, 26 Latvian and 15 Estonian buildings on this list.

== Completed buildings ==
Was the tallest building in the Baltic states upon completion

Rank	Image	Name	City	Country	Height	Floors	Year	Notes
1		Europa Tower	Vilnius	Lithuania	148.3 m (487 ft)	33	2005	The tallest building in the Baltic states
2		St. Olaf's Church	Tallinn	Estonia	123.7 m (406 ft)		1549	The tallest building in Estonia
3		St. Peter's Church	Riga	Latvia	123.25 m (404 ft)		1690	The tallest building in Latvia.
4		Zunda Towers I	Riga	Latvia	123 m (404 ft)	31	2019	The tallest twin towers in the Baltic states
5		Saules akmens	Riga	Latvia	122.78 m (403 ft)	27	2004	
6		Zunda Towers II	Riga	Latvia	117.5 m (385 ft)	30	2019	The tallest twin towers in the Baltic states
7=		Swissôtel Tallinn	Tallinn	Estonia	117 m (384 ft)	30	2007	Tallest hotel in the Baltic states
8=		Tornimäe Building Complex	Tallinn	Estonia	117 m (384 ft)	30	2006	
9		Pilsotas	Klaipėda	Lithuania	112 m (367 ft)	34	2007	
10		Arter Kvartal	Tallinn	Estonia	111 m (364 ft)	28	2024	
11		Maakri Torn	Tallinn	Estonia	110 m (361 ft)	30	2018	
12		Latvian Academy of Sciences	Riga	Latvia	107.6 m (353 ft)	21	1958	
13		St. Nicholas' Church	Tallinn	Estonia	105 m (344 ft)		1515	
14		#Tower	Vilnius	Lithuania	104 m (341 ft)	29	2018	
15		Radisson Blu Hotel Tallinn	Tallinn	Estonia	103 m (338 ft)	25	2001	
16=		Panorama Plaza II	Riga	Latvia	101.5 m (333 ft)	32	2007	
17=		Panorama Plaza III	Riga	Latvia	101.5 m (333 ft)	30	2024	
18		Helios City Tower A	Vilnius	Lithuania	97.67 m (320 ft)	27	2006	
19		Europe Square Apartments	Vilnius	Lithuania	96.19 m (316 ft)	27	2004	
20		Skyon	Tallinn	Estonia	95 m (312 ft)	26	2021	
21		SEB Pank main building	Tallinn	Estonia	94.4 m (310 ft)	24	1999	
22		Ministry of Agriculture Building Riga	Riga	Latvia	92.5 m (303 ft)	26	1978	
23		St. James's Cathedral	Riga	Latvia	91.64 m (301 ft)		1225	Building is originally 86 m tall, a rooster tops the building since June 2, 1726.
24		Riga Cathedral	Riga	Latvia	90 m (295 ft)		1211	
25		Tigutorn	Tartu	Estonia	89.92 m (295 ft)	23	2008	
26		Latvijas Televizija	Riga	Latvia	88.7 m (291 ft)	22	1987	
27		Vilnius Business Harbour Tower A	Vilnius	Lithuania	87.78 m (288 ft)	24	2008	
28		Radisson Blu Hotel Latvija	Riga	Latvia	85.65 m (281 ft)	27	1976	
29		Radisson Blu Hotel Lietuva	Vilnius	Lithuania	85.3 m (280 ft)	23	1983	
30=		Radisson Blu Hotel Olümpia	Tallinn	Estonia	84 m (276 ft)	28	1980	
31=		Artery	Vilnius	Lithuania	84 m (276 ft)	20	2023	
32		Panorama Plaza I	Riga	Latvia	83.3 m (273 ft)	27	2006	
33		Grand Office	Vilnius	Lithuania	82.4 m (270 ft)	21	2014	
34		Big2 2	Klaipėda	Lithuania	82 m (269 ft)	25	2009	
35		Vilnius Business Harbour D Tower (a.k.a. "Trečia Burė")	Vilnius	Lithuania	81 m (266 ft)	23	2018	
36		Astra Lux	Riga	Latvia	80.7 m (265 ft)	25	2007	
37=		Solaris I	Riga	Latvia	79.2 m (260 ft)	25	2005	
38=		Solaris II	Riga	Latvia	79.2 m (260 ft)	25	2005	
39		Church of St. Matthew	Anykščiai	Lithuania	79 m (259 ft)		1909	
40		City Plaza	Tallinn	Estonia	78 m (256 ft)	23	2004	
41		Municipality building	Vilnius	Lithuania	76.85 m (252 ft)	20	2004	
42		Preses Nams	Riga	Latvia	76.8 m (252 ft)	22	1977	Undergoing reconstruction
43		Vilnius Gate Apartments	Vilnius	Lithuania	76.7 m (252 ft)	18	2007	
44		Victoria Tower	Vilnius	Lithuania	76.3 m (250 ft)	16	2005	
45		Viršuliškių Porelė 1	Vilnius	Lithuania	75.81 m (249 ft)	24	2006	
46		Viršuliškių Porelė 2	Vilnius	Lithuania	75.63 m (248 ft)	24	2006	
47=		The Assumption Of The Blessed Virgin Mary Church	Joniškis	Lithuania	75 m (246 ft)		1626	
48=		Church of St. Jacob	Švėkšna	Lithuania	75 m (246 ft)		1905	
49=		Church of Saint Mary	Salakas	Lithuania	75 m (246 ft)		1911	
50=		Church of Blessed Virgin Mary, Queen of Peace	Klaipėda	Lithuania	75 m (246 ft)		1960	
51		Flow	Vilnius	Lithuania	74.8 m (245 ft)	20	2023	
52=		St. John's Church	Ramygala	Lithuania	74 m (243 ft)		1914	
53=		Skanstes Virsotnes I	Riga	Latvia	74 m (243 ft)	24	2008	
54=		Skanstes Virsotnes II	Riga	Latvia	74 m (243 ft)	24	2008	
55=		Skanstes Virsotnes III	Riga	Latvia	74 m (243 ft)	24	2011	
56=		Skanstes Virsotnes IV	Riga	Latvia	74 m (243 ft)	24	2012	
57=		Sokos Hotel Viru	Tallinn	Estonia	74 m (243 ft)	23	1972	
58		Holy Trinity Church	Lygumai	Lithuania	73.84 m (242 ft)		1915	
59=		Big2 1	Klaipėda	Lithuania	73 m (240 ft)	22	2009	
60=		Big2 3	Klaipėda	Lithuania	73 m (240 ft)	22	2009	
61=		K Tower	Klaipėda	Lithuania	73 m (240 ft)	21	2006	
62=		D Tower	Klaipėda	Lithuania	73 m (240 ft)	21	2006	
63		Zirgo butai	Vilnius	Lithuania	72.3 m (237 ft)	20	2004	
64=		Maakri Maja	Tallinn	Estonia	72 m (236 ft)	20	2003	
65=		Dragūnų 1	Klaipėda	Lithuania	72 m (236 ft)	19	2009	
66=		Dragūnų 2	Klaipėda	Lithuania	72 m (236 ft)	19	2013	
67		Press Building	Vilnius	Lithuania	71.43 m (234 ft)	18	1986	
68=		St. Mary's Church	Kretinga	Lithuania	70 m (230 ft)		1617	
69=		Cathedral of Saints Peter and Paul	Šiauliai	Lithuania	70 m (230 ft)		1626	
70=		St. Mary Church	Salantai	Lithuania	70 m (230 ft)		1911	
71=		Christ's Resurrection Church	Kaunas	Lithuania	70 m (230 ft)		1940	
72=		Philosophers Residence I	Riga	Latvia	70 m (230 ft)	21	2019	
73=		Rietumu Capital Centre	Riga	Latvia	70 m (230 ft)	20	2008	
74=		High Smeltė	Klaipėda	Lithuania	70 m (230 ft)	20	2010	
75=		Skylum A	Vilnius	Lithuania	70 m (230 ft)	20	2023	
76=		Skylum Buzz	Vilnius	Lithuania	70 m (230 ft)	20	2023	
77		Sky Office	Vilnius	Lithuania	69.55 m (228 ft)	18	2023	
78		Klaipėda Sail	Klaipėda	Lithuania	69.2 m (227 ft)	21	2009	
79		Centra nams	Riga	Latvia	69.05 m (227 ft)	9	2005	Roof height is 44 m.
80		St. Gertrude's New Church	Riga	Latvia	69 m (226 ft)		1906	
81		Quadrum Business City East Building	Vilnius	Lithuania	68.52 m (225 ft)	18	2015	
82		Church of St. Johns	Vilnius	Lithuania	68.2 m (224 ft)		1571	
83=		St. Mary's Cathedral	Tallinn	Estonia	68 m (223 ft)		1779	
84=		National Library of Latvia	Riga	Latvia	68 m (223 ft)	13	2013	

== Under construction ==
This table lists buildings that are under construction in the Baltic states and are planned to rise at least 70 m (230 ft).

Image	Building	City	Country	Height	Floors	Est. completion	Notes
	Eedu	Tallinn	Estonia	105 m (344 ft)	30	2027	
	City Plaza 2	Tallinn	Estonia	101 m (331 ft)	28	2028	
	Church of St. John	Klaipėda	Lithuania	82 m (269 ft)	-	2027	
	Mustamäe Manhattan	Tallinn	Estonia	76.7 m (252 ft)	24	2027	

== On hold ==
This table lists buildings that are on hold in the Baltic states and are planned to rise at least 64 m (210 ft).

Building	City	Country	Height	Floors	Reason	Refs
MEGA	Klaipėda	Lithuania	71 m (233 ft)	15		

== Proposed ==
This table lists buildings that are proposed in the Baltic states and are planned to rise at least 64 m (210 ft).

Building	City	Country	Height	Floors	Status	Est. completion
Tartu Maantee 17	Tallinn	Estonia	125 m (410 ft)	31	Not approved	
Liivalaia 49-53	Tallinn	Estonia	122.4 m (402 ft)	31	Not approved	
Maakri 29	Tallinn	Estonia	120 m (394 ft)	36	Approved	
Lvivo 38	Vilnius	Lithuania	115 m (377 ft)	30	Approved	
K26	Vilnius	Lithuania	111.4 m (365 ft)	29	Not approved	
Burė 4	Vilnius	Lithuania	105 m (344 ft)	?	Not approved	
Tartu Maantee 1	Tallinn	Estonia	101.2 m (332 ft)	30	Not approved	
Balasta dambis 1	Riga	Latvia	91 m (299 ft)	23	Not approved	
Rocca Towers IV	Tallinn	Estonia	90 m (295 ft)	27	Not approved	
Lucavsalas iela 5	Riga	Latvia	85 m (279 ft)	23	Not approved	
Lvivo 59 A Tower	Vilnius	Lithuania	85 m (279 ft)	22	Approved	
Minijos g. 119	Klaipėda	Lithuania	80 m (262 ft)	20	Not approved	
Paldiski mnt 108	Tallinn	Estonia	77 m (253 ft)	22	Not approved	
Lvovo 59 C Tower	Vilnius	Lithuania	75 m (246 ft)	18	Not approved	
Lvovo 59 B Tower	Vilnius	Lithuania	70 m (230 ft)	17	Not approved	
Poligrafijos 3	Vilnius	Lithuania	65 m (213 ft)	18	Not approved	
Laisvės pr. 58	Vilnius	Lithuania	76.3 m (250 ft)	20	Not approved	

== See also ==
- List of tallest buildings in Estonia
- List of tallest buildings in Latvia
- List of tallest buildings in Lithuania
- List of tallest buildings in Europe
- List of tallest buildings in Scandinavia
