= Selonia military training area =

Zalves poligons

Location
- Area: 25,605.8 ha

Selonia military training area (Latvian: Sēlijas militārais poligons) or Zalve military training area (Latvian: Zalves poligons) is a planned international military base in Latvia.

== Plan ==
Selonia military zone is a planned international military base and zone to be located in the south of the country, between Aizkraukles and Jēkabpils Municipalities. The Ministry of Defense plans to take over 24,500 hectares of land owned by state forestry company Latvijas valsts meži as well as 1,000 hectares of private land. On 21 June 2023, the government passed a law that would designate the zone as an area of "national interest", which ensures expedited planning and construction. The construction is planned in several stages, with the first stage completion planned by the end of 2025 at an estimated cost of EUR 38 million.

In 2026, Lithuania and Latvia agreed to hold joint military exercises in the training area.

== Background ==
At the 2022 Madrid summit a commitment was made to significantly increase NATO deployments to Latvia and the other Baltic states in the wake of Russia's invasion of Ukraine. On July 5, Minister of Defense Artis Pabriks announced the plans to establish another international military zone and base (in addition to Ādaži military zone). At the time, the Canada-led NATO battlegroup in Latvia comprised about 1,700 soldiers from 10 countries. Pabriks and Canada's Minister of National Defence, Anita Anand, signed a declaration as to NATO's expanded presence in Latvia and battleground strengthening and development. The new commitment was to increase the combat-ready personnel from a group size to a brigade size – 3,000 to 5,000 soldiers. Pabriks remarked that Latvia would commit to co-financing the new military infrastructure. Canada on its part committed to lead the group and cooperate with other NATO members for co-financing of infrastructure. At the time, the NATO forces were based at the Ādaži military zone's camp, which was insufficient for the additional large numbers of reinforcements, including infrastructure, services, and amenities for soldiers and support staff. Pabriks explained that minimizing the inconvenience to citizens was the primary criteria for the choice of the location, as well as proximity to Lithuania, historical significance, and potential for economic growth for the two municipalities. In January 2023, Latvian National Armed Forces (NBS) commander Leonīds Kalniņš said that development will begin this year so that larger groups than possible in Ādaži can begin training as soon as possible.

== Environmental impact ==
As of 2022, the majority of the area is forests, meadows, and agricultural land. Pabriks stated that the military zone will be established in an area rich in animal habitats that the armed forces will respect and not endanger. Local residents will be able to continue to gather mushrooms and berries in most of the military zone, and the movement on regional and national roads will not be prohibited. A new law set new restrictions for hunting and specified that protected nature territories may be established in the military zones, but no new micro-reserves.

== Economic impact ==
Pabriks noted that base should be a boost to local businesses, comparing it to the experience with Ādaži base. Regional business owners and politicians were hopeful about the potential economic opportunities and growth, while local farmers remained more skeptical and concerned about managing their land. While the exact project scope remains unknown, it is expected that there will be new road and infrastructure projects. Businesses were hopeful that this would increase the number of customers, but also noted that the priority was keeping the current businesses open during the economic situation rather than expansion.
