= Ministry of Agriculture Building =

Skyscraper in Riga, Latvia

- Zemkopības ministrijas augstceltne (Latvian)
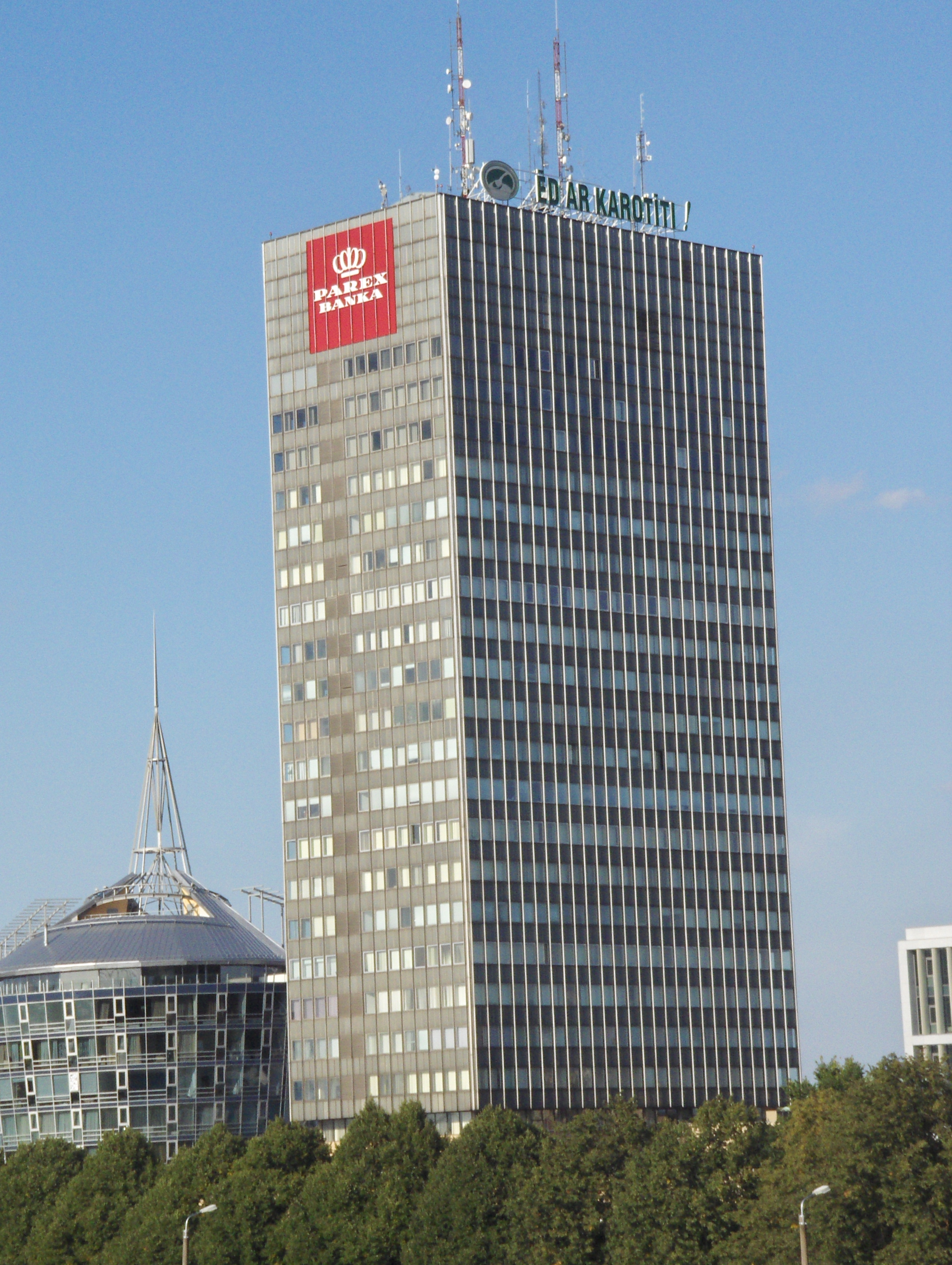

General information
- Status: Completed
- Type: Office
- Location: 2 Republikas Laukums, Riga, Latvia
- Coordinates: 56.95443°N 24.10034°E
- Construction started: 1968
- Completed: 1976
- Opened: 1978
- Owner: Ministry of Agriculture of the Republic of Latvia

Height
- Roof: 92 m (302 ft)

Technical details
- Structural system: Reinforced concrete
- Floor count: 26
- Floor area: 22,883 m^{2} (246,000 sq ft)

Design and construction
- Architects: Arturs Reinfelds, V. Kadirkovs & V. Maike

The Ministry of Agriculture Building, traditionally known as the Skābbarības torni (transl. Latvian – transl. "Silage Tower") is a high-rise office building in the Central district of Riga, Latvia. Built between 1968 and 1976, and opened in 1978, the tower stands at 92 m (302 ft) tall with 26 floors and is the current seventh tallest building in Latvia. It serves as the headquarters of the Latvian Ministry of Agriculture.

== History ==
=== Design ===
The initial version of the high-rise building envisaged the construction of three (24, 20 and 19 storeys) high-rise buildings and the creation of a large square. In 1965, architects E. Pučiņš, K. Alksnis and V. Dorofejevs developed a new planning project for Republic Square. The group of three high-rise buildings was an attempt to create a government center in the Citadel of Riga, combining many ministries into several high-rise buildings. The large universal hall of the building of state institutions and design institutes would have been the largest complex in Riga, providing working conditions for approximately 7,000 employees.

The construction of the building began around 1960 and continued with interruptions until 1986. The building complex owns a land area of 13,000 m^{2} (140,000 sq ft). The author of the project believed that the content and dimensions of the designed complex (188x65 meters) allow creating a place for mass demonstrations, army and fitness parades and national festivals. The elevation of the building was justified by the fact that the optical axes of the continuation of the two main Pārdaugava highways — Vienības and Jūrmalas gatves — intersect at this location and, accordingly, by arranging the left bank buildings, the high-rise buildings of the administrative complex should close the perspective of these highways on the threshold of the center.

The building complex was planned to be freely placed in the greenery, moreover, creating a green parterre as a continuation of the greenery of the Pioneers (now Castle) Square. A green belt would also be created between the square and the Daugava embankment. The demonstration square was planned to be built on two terraces, the upper of which was intended for a tribune, the perspective of the Square in the southern direction would turn towards the Palace, and in the northern direction it would be closed by a monument dedicated to the fiftieth anniversary of the October Revolution, the design of which began in 1969, but in 1975 the project was frozen in favor of the construction of the Monument to the Liberators of Soviet Latvia and Riga from the German fascist invaders and construction was not started.

=== Construction ===
The Republic Square project was large and complex, the square had to be adapted for tank parades, while providing parking spaces underneath. Due to the lack of money from the Capital Construction Department of the executive committee of the City Council of People's Deputies, many 17th - 19th century buildings in the Citadel were not demolished and construction began. There were no legal obstacles to the demolition of buildings at that time, because historical buildings had not yet acquired the status of architectural monuments. Over the years, public reverence for cultural and historical heritage and demands not to encroach on buildings intended for demolition grew. By preserving them, the high-rise building acquired a peculiar "undergrowth", but the implementation of the project moved away from the architect's intended prototype of 20th century architecture.

The author of the project believed that a compact group of homogeneous, geometrically pure new high-rise buildings was contrasted with the scattered, pointed, variously detailed ancient towers. The project was based on the recognition that the emphasized contrasts of location, forms, proportions, materials, emphasizing the new, also helped to reveal the artistry in the old. However, today some architects consider this opinion to be erroneous, because the contrasting opposition of two objects raises the question - which of the two dominates - in this case a 24-story high-rise building, which does not correspond to the author's idea.

=== Project image ===
The failure of the first tower put an end to the initial version of the project. The public was not satisfied with either the slow construction of the first high-rise building or its architecture, which is why the building intended for the Ministry of Agriculture was nicknamed the "Silage Tower". Already during its construction, discussions began among architects about the need to revise the composition of the three towers, which was supported by the wider public. The design institutes each built their own building and the unification plan had failed, and in addition, the centralized Soviet planning also failed to coordinate the use of funds for construction. There was no specific construction program for the third, final high-rise building in this complex.

In the 1970s, when the failure of the three towers became clear, a group led by architect I. Jākobsons (V. Savisko, I. Grietēna) repeatedly returned to the projects of the buildings forming the square with different construction programs and buildings reduced to seven floors. However, none of the builders could cope with the heavy and capacious reconstruction of the Citadel. One of the options for completing the begun complex of high-rise buildings with smaller buildings was the Ministry of Finance Computing Center, which was a 5-6-story high, square building on the N side of the high-rise building, which was proposed in 1981 by architects I. Jākobsons and I. Akolova.

The last time a serious solution was sought was in 1987, when a competition was announced for the best project for a concert hall in the Citadel, at the foot of a high-rise building, and at the same time, a request was made to respect the already developed project for the layout of Republic Square. In it, the proposal of architects A. Kronbergs, V. Neilands and E. Trimanis for the first time questioned the necessity of military parades and, consequently, the monumental character of the square. The highest prize was awarded to the much more conventional project of V. Kadyrkov, but the work was not continued.

In 1999, a multi-storey car park was built on Republic Square, but in the mid- 2000s the building was demolished and a low-rise bank building for Parex banka was built in its place.

=== Building operation ===
On March 25, 1991, an indefinite-term agreement was concluded between the Ministry of Agriculture of the Republic of Latvia (since 1993 the Ministry of Agriculture of the Republic of Latvia) and SIA "Augstceltne" on the transfer of property for management. In addition to holding an auction, fixed assets for LVR 667,000 were also transferred to SIA "Augstceltne". The administrative building was operated by SIA "Augstceltne", the Ministry's Economic Department was responsible for leasing the premises and collecting the rent, which is the source of funds necessary for operation. When settling accounts with SIA "Augstceltne", not all the funds obtained were directed to cover operating expenses, but were used to pay for other needs of the ministry. As a result, the ministry's debt to SIA "Augstceltne" was formed annually - on January 1, 1996, the ministry's debt to SIA "Augstceltne" was LVL 36,001. On June 19, 1995, the Ministry of the Interior concluded an additional agreement with "Augstceltne" stating that Augstceltne was authorized to seek clients and conclude contracts for the lease of high-rise building areas, observing the rental fee set by the Ministry of the Interior, and to collect all due payments from tenants.

In 2002, attempts began to privatize the building, and then lease it back to the state. By Order No. 692 of the Cabinet of Ministers of the Republic of Latvia of November 10, 1995, the administrative high-rise building in Riga, at Republikas laukums 2, was transferred for privatization.

== See also ==
- List of tallest buildings in Latvia
- List of tallest buildings in the Baltic states
