= Panorama Plaza =

Skyscraper in Riga, Latvia

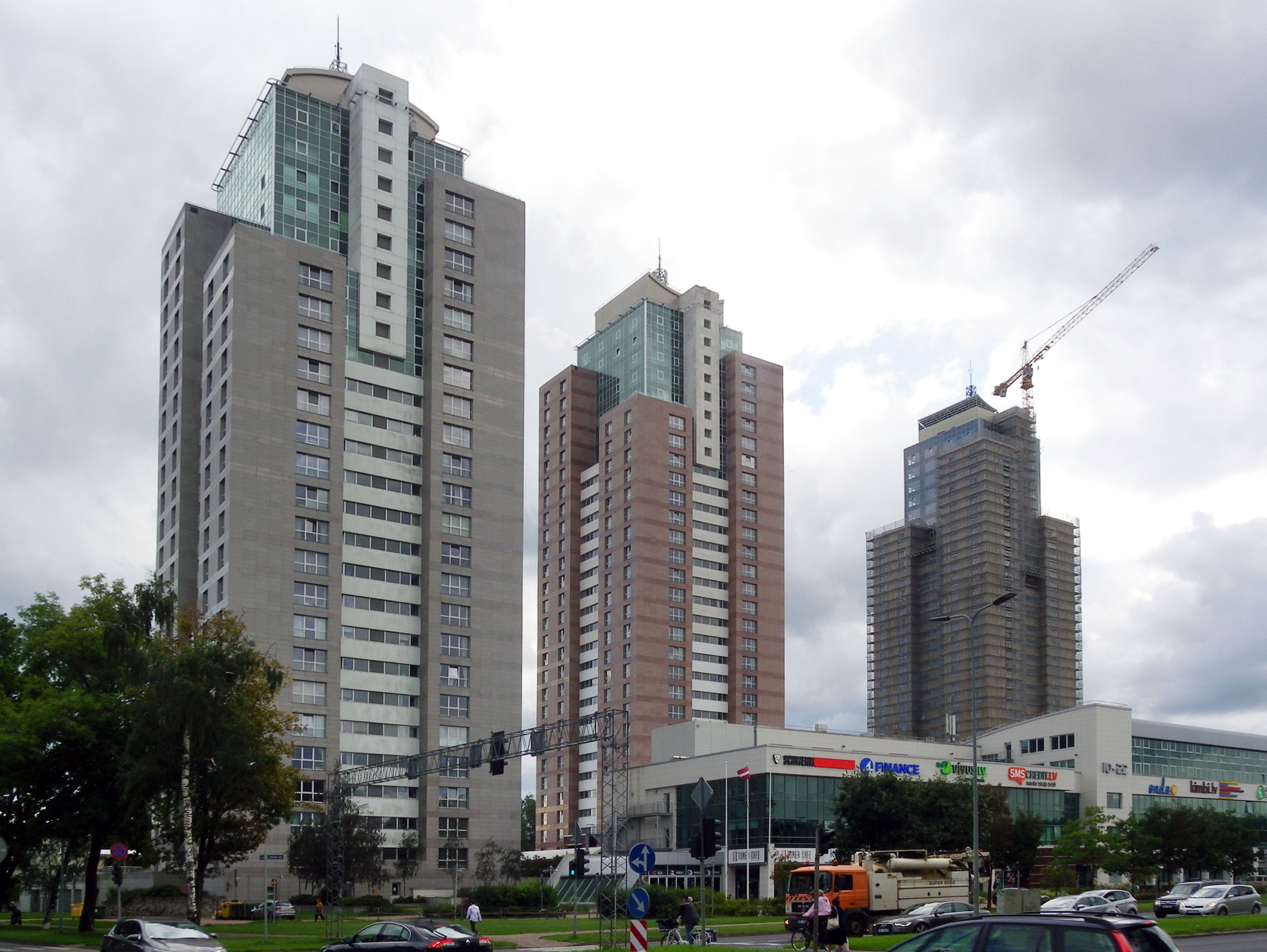
- Interactive map of the Panorama Plaza area

General information
- Status: Completed
- Type: Residential
- Location: 5 Jaunmoku Street 5, Riga, Latvia
- Coordinates: 56.93405°N 24.04383°E
- Construction started: 2004
- Completed: 2024 (Tower III)
- Owner: MESA Group; SIA "Rossel"

Height
- Roof: 114 m (374 ft) (Tower II and III)

Technical details
- Structural system: Reinforced concrete
- Floor count: 32 (Tower II and III)

Design and construction
- Architect: Nams

The Panorama Plaza is a high-rise residential complex in the Pardaugava district of Riga, Latvia. Built between 2004 and 2024, the complex consists of four main towers, with the tallest two standing at 114 m (374 ft) tall with 32 floors (Tower II and III), which are the joint-third tallest building in Latvia.

== History ==
The complex was planned to consist of four double-height multi-storey residential buildings, as well as an office and retail extension. The four towers would be located on the same level along the street (the two tallest in the center, and the lowest on the outer edges). The total height of the tallest buildings was planned to be 114 meters, and the lowest 99 meters (number of floors, respectively, 32 and 27).

The project developer was the Turkish concern MESA Group, the customer was the Latvian-Turkish joint venture SIA «Latmes Building», the general contractor was the architectural firm SIA "Nams", SIA "PBLC", the construction supervisor was SIA "Project Management and Development Bureau".

The project was launched in 2004 and the foundation stone of the residential complex was laid on February 9, 2005. The construction of the first "Panorama Plaza" high-rise building (site preparation works) was started in 2004 and was completed in 2006. The construction of the second building was started in 2005 and also lasted two years. The construction of the third and fourth buildings of the complex was started in 2007 and 2008, respectively. However, in 2008, due to the global economic crisis and the bursting of the real estate "bubble" in Latvia, the project was initially suspended, but was later frozen due to inactivity.

In 2010, bankruptcy proceedings were initiated against SIA «Latmes Building». In 2011, the subsidiary of its largest creditor Swedbank, SIA «Ektornet Residential Latvia», bought the unfinished third building from the insolvent SIA «Latmes Building». In 2011, "Ektornet" also bought the rest of the complex and in 2013 sold the residential complex, retaining only the complex's shopping and business center for lease. At that time, it was planned to continue the construction of the unfinished towers. The new owner of the residential buildings was SIA "Rossel", created in 2012, and renamed the residential part of the project "Panorama Residence".

In 2017, a fire broke out in the four-story office and retail building, which was extinguished without injuries or serious damage to the building. Until then, the building had regularly experienced false fire alarms due to the oversensitivity of the security systems.

In 2019, the first two buildings were operational, construction of the others was still stalled, and the half-built third building was occasionally roamed by teenagers. Construction work on the site resumed in 2021.

== Buildings ==
Name	Image	Height m (ft)	Floors	Construction period	Ref
Tower I		99	27	2004–2006	
Tower II		114	32	2005–2007	
Tower III		114	32	2007–2024	
Tower IV		99	27	2008–present	

== See also ==
- List of tallest buildings in Latvia
- List of tallest buildings in the Baltic states
