= List of tallest buildings in Latvia =

This is a list of the tallest buildings in Latvia.

== Completed buildings ==
Was the tallest building in Latvia upon completion

Rank	Name	Image	Location	Height	Floors	Year	Notes
1	Zunda-Towers (lv)		Riga	123 m (404 ft)	30	2017	
2	Saules akmens (lv)		Riga	123 m (404 ft)	27	2004	Swedbank central office. Roof height is 110 m.
3	Panorama Plaza III (lv)		Riga	114 m (374 ft)	32	2024	
4	Panorama Plaza II (lv)		Riga	114 m (374 ft)	32	2007	On right
5	Academy of Sciences building (lv)		Riga	107 m (351 ft)	21	1955	
6	Panorama Plaza I (lv)		Riga	99 m (325 ft)	27	2006	On left
7	Radisson Blu Hotel Latvija (lv)		Riga	95 m (312 ft)	27	1979	Reconstructed in 2001
8	Ministry of Agriculture Building Riga (lv)		Riga	92 m (302 ft)	26	1976	
9	Latvijas Televizija (lv)		Riga	89 m (292 ft)	22	1988	
10	Astra Lux (lv)		Riga	81 m (266 ft)	25	2007	
11	Solaris I (lv)		Riga	78 m (256 ft)	25	2005	
12	Solaris II (lv)		Riga	78 m (256 ft)	25	2005	
13	Preses Nams (lv)		Riga	77 m (253 ft)	22	1977	Mostly vacant (almost 90%). Complete renovation commenced 2020.
14	Skanstes Virsotne I		Riga	74 m (243 ft)	24	2008	
15	Skanstes Virsotne II		Riga	74 m (243 ft)	24	2008	
16	Skanstes Virsotne III		Riga	74 m (243 ft)	24	2011	
17	Skanstes Virsotne IV		Riga	74 m (243 ft)	24	2012	
18	Rietumu Capital Centre (lv)		Riga	70 m (230 ft)	20	2008	Rietumu Banka central office
19	National Library of Latvia		Riga	68 m (223 ft)	13	2014	

== Proposed and under construction skyscrapers ==
Rank	Name	Location	Height	Floors	Year	Note-
#	Riga 201	Riga	201 m (659 ft)	?	2029	
#	Zaķusalas krastmala 21	Riga	137 m (449 ft)	40	?	
#	Daugavgrīvas iela 7	Riga	130 m (427 ft)	?	?	
#	Biznesa Centrs Zaķusala	Riga	100 m (328 ft)	27	2018	
#	Panorama Plaza IV (lv)	Riga	99 m (325 ft)	25	on hold	
#	Da Vinci apartments	Riga	95 m (312 ft)	27	suspended	
#	Zaķusalas vārti B	Riga	84 m (276 ft)	24	?	
#	Balasta Dambis 1	Riga	80 m (262 ft)	20	2019	
#	Philosophers Residence	Riga	79 m (259 ft)	21	2018	
#	Zaķusalas vārti A	Riga	73 m (240 ft)	?	?	
#	Zaķusalas vārti C	Riga	70 m (230 ft)	?	?	
