= Saules akmens =

Skyscraper in Riga, Latvia

Swedbank Central Office
- Saules akmens (Latvian)
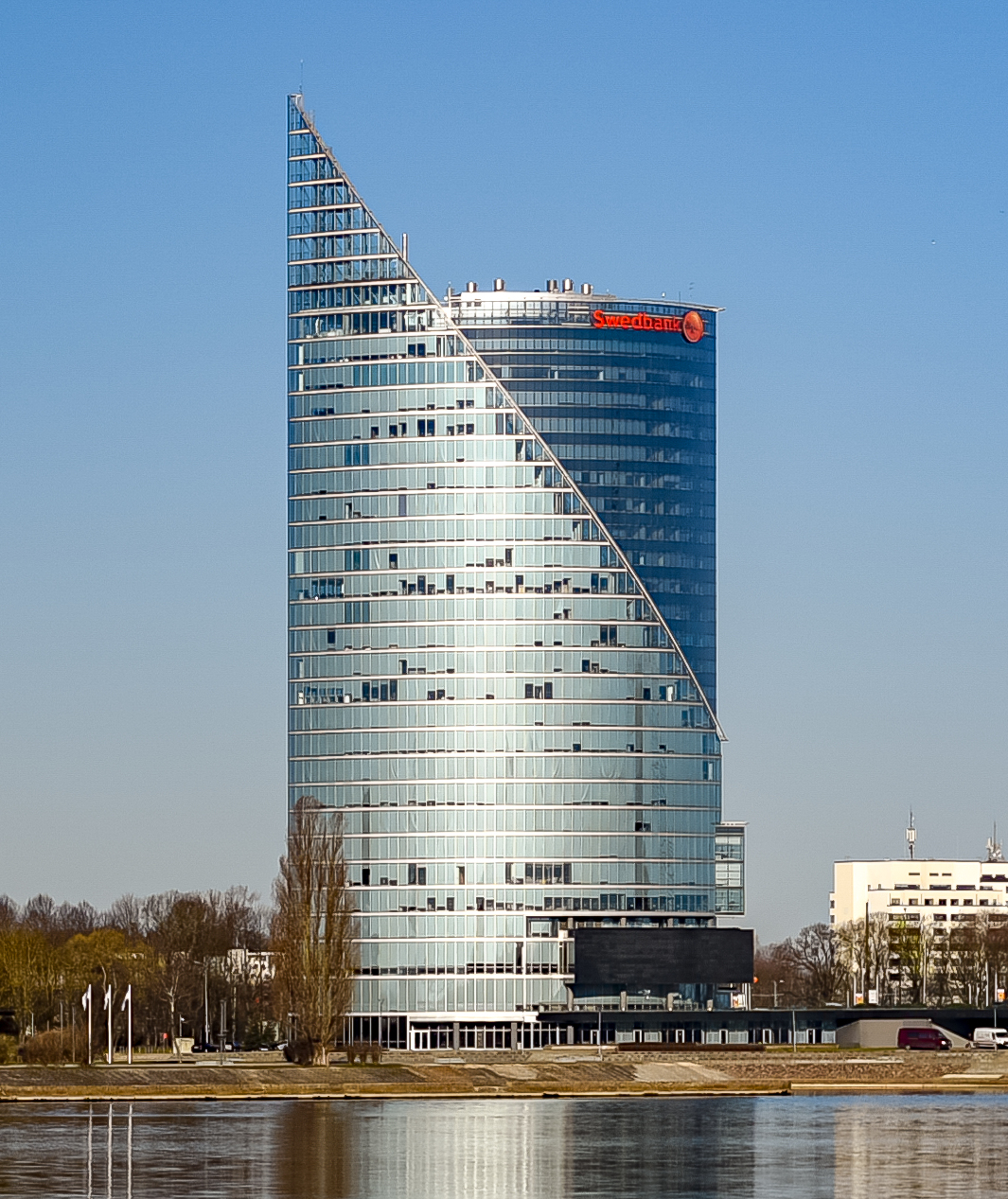
- Interactive map of the Swedbank Central Office area

General information
- Status: Completed
- Type: Office
- Location: Balasta dambis 1a, Riga, Latvia
- Coordinates: 56.94896°N 24.08947°E
- Construction started: 2002
- Completed: 2004
- Owner: JSC Hansabanka & Swedbank

Height
- Roof: 120.8 m (396 ft)

Technical details
- Structural system: Reinforced concrete
- Floor count: 27 (+2 underground)
- Floor area: 29,900 m^{2} (322,000 sq ft)

Design and construction
- Architects: Zenico Project Tectum (Viktors Valgums & Alvis Zlaugotnis)
- Developer: Vineta Verika
- Main contractor: Merck

The Swedbank Central Office, traditionally known as the Saules akmens (transl. Latvian – transl. "Sunstone") is an office skyscraper in Riga, Latvia. Built between 2002 and 2004, the tower stands at 120.8 m (396 ft) tall with 27 floors and is the current second tallest building in Latvia.

== History ==
The building has 27 floors (26 floors + one technical floor), with a total height (excluding its antenna) of 120.8 meters, making it the second tallest building in Riga and Latvia. Construction of the tower began on 14 February 2003 with the laying of the foundation stone. The building was commissioned on 17 November 2004. The building houses the head office of Swedbank.

The functional solution of the floors is based on a layout with a central core in the middle and work spaces around it. This solution opens up a whole 360-degree view from the interior to the Old Town, Pārdaugava and the port. According to the compositional structure of the building, two facade constructive solutions with an emphasized horizontal division in the sloping height facade part were used in the tower part - floor-to-ceiling glazing, in the cylindrical tower part - a glazed facade system.

Around the building, a green area with recreational areas and access to the Daugava River bank is being created, covering an area of approximately 2 ha, accessible to the entire public. The shoreline of the Āgenskalns Bay has been strengthened. Reflecting pools are being created on the territory of the green area at various levels, in which the facade glazing and the surrounding environment will be reflected, thus connecting the building with the water surface view and reflecting the panorama of Old Riga. During the dark hours of the day, the building will be marked by facade lighting.

The height of the building is 122.78 meters (top of the spire) Number of floors: 27 above-ground floors, 2 underground levels. 286 piles, driving depth up to 27 meters. Total area: 29,908 m^{2} Parking area: 6735 m^{2} Floor area: average 756 m^{2} Jobs: 1100 Parking spaces: 400 Total lift capacity: 14,500 kg Metal structures: 100 tons Concrete: 14,000 m^{3} Glass: 13,000 m^{2} Electrical cables: 500 km Pipes: 50 km Number of construction workers employed: 300 Involved designers, consultants: 80 Tallest crane used in construction: 128.5 meters.

== See also ==
- List of tallest buildings in Latvia
- List of tallest buildings in the Baltic states
