= Citadel of Riga =

Fortress in Riga, Latvia

- Riga, Latvia
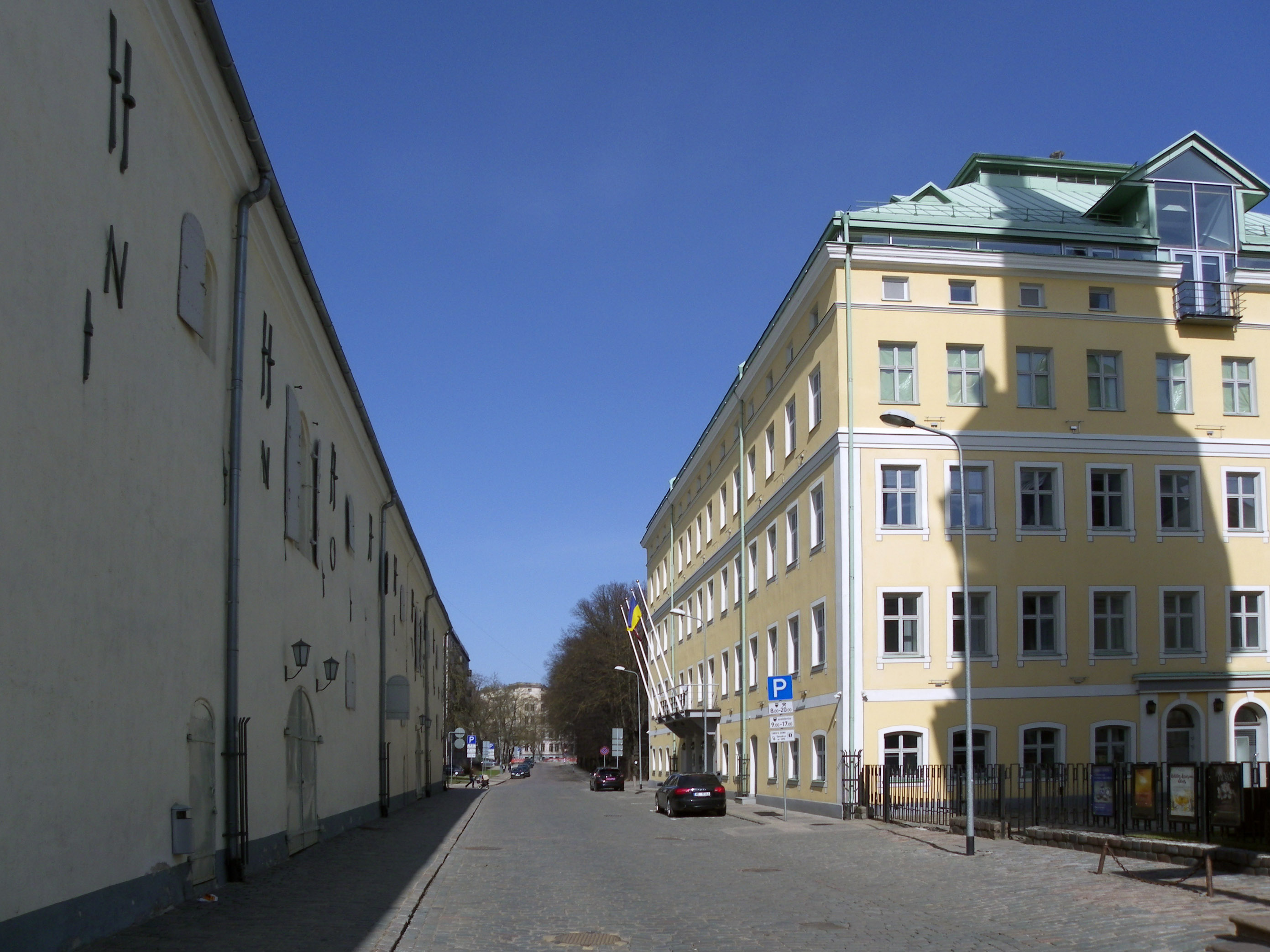
- Citadeles Street between the former warehouse (1728) and the provincial prison (1786)

Site information
- Type: Fortress
- Controlled by: (yes) Swedish Empire (initially), Russian Empire (later)
- Condition: Partially preserved (some buildings remain)

Location
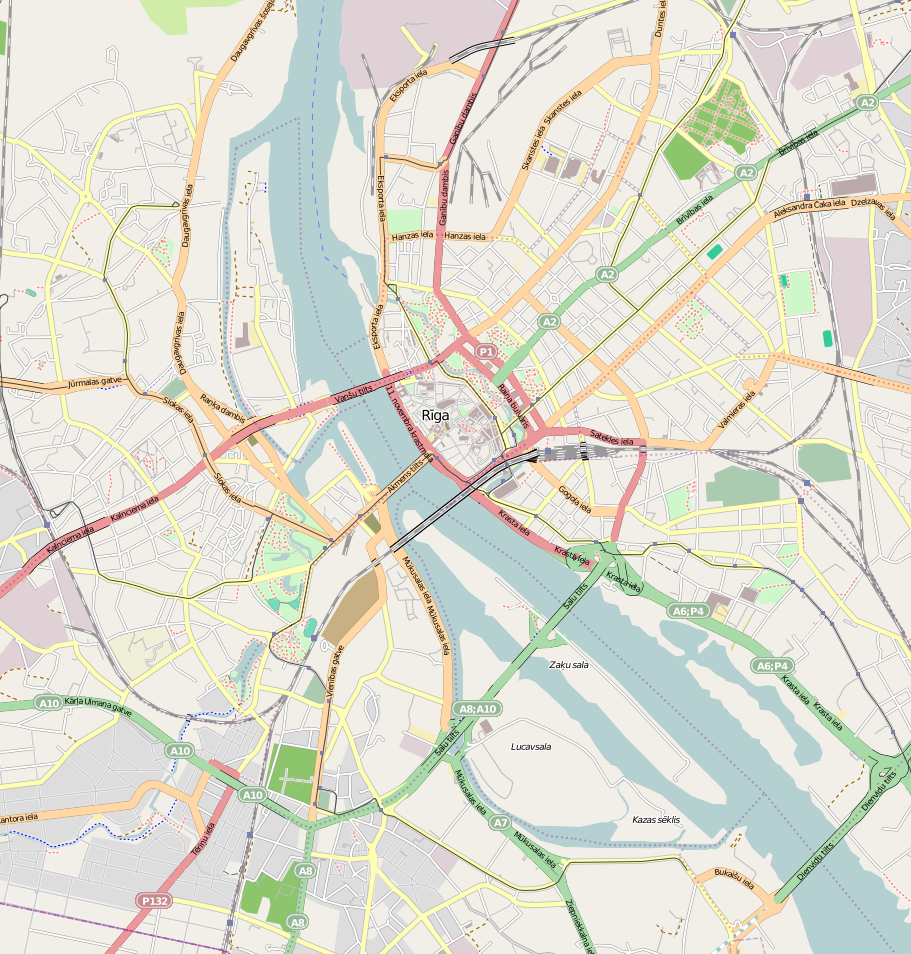
- Location within Riga
- Coordinates: 56°57′16″N 24°06′03″E

Site history
- Built: Mid-17th century
- Built by: Erik Dahlbergh
- In use: 17th–19th centuries
- Fate: Decommissioned 1867, demolished 1872–1875
- Events: Siege of Riga (1656), Siege of Riga (1700), Siege of Riga (1709–1710)

Garrison information
- Garrison: Riga city garrison

The Citadel of Riga was a fortress in Riga, located near the Old Town, existing from the 17th to 19th centuries. It provided additional defense for the city and served as a base for the city garrison. It was heavily damaged during the Siege of Riga by the forces of Peter I in 1709 and was repeatedly rebuilt. It was decommissioned as a fortress in 1867.

Today, the name "Citadel" remains associated with the area where the fortress once stood—between the banks of the Daugava north of the Riga Castle, Krišjāņa Valdemāra Street, Kronvalda Boulevard, and the Riga city canal. Several historical buildings have been preserved.

== History ==
Construction of the Citadel began during the period when Riga was under the control of the Swedish Empire. As early as the 1630s, individual fortifications were built north of the Riga Castle to prevent potential enemy attacks from the sea. According to the initial design by engineer Johann Rodenburg (early 1640s), the Citadel was intended to include the Riga Castle itself. After expansion based on the design by Erik Dahlbergh (1670s), the Citadel became a fortress surrounded by earthen ramparts with six pentagonal bastions, a moat, and two ravelins; additional fortifications were constructed along the river. Inside, there were several wooden barracks, and it stored cannons, ammunition, and gunpowder. The Citadel was connected to the city by a drawbridge leading to the Royal Gates, built into the fortress rampart; two additional gates opened toward the Daugava River and the northern side.

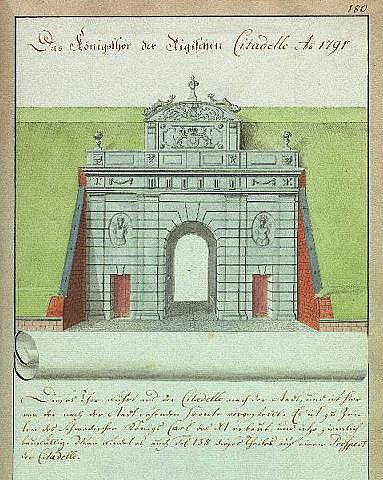
Royal Gates of the Riga Citadel. Drawing by Johann Christoph Brotze (1791)

The Citadel successfully repelled its first attack during the Russo-Swedish War, when the troops of Russian Tsar Alexei Mikhailovich invaded Swedish Livonia and the Siege of Riga lasted over a month. The fortress also withstood a siege by Saxon troops during the Siege of Riga in 1700. However, in 1709, the Citadel suffered severe damage when the troops of Peter I subjected the city to heavy artillery bombardment. The siege lasted nine months. On the morning of December 23 [O.S. 12], a direct hit ignited a tower in the Citadel storing 1,200 barrels of gunpowder. The fire spread to an adjacent tower containing 1,800 grenades. The resulting explosions destroyed all the Citadel’s structures, the earthen embankment on the Daugava side, and nearby city buildings; approximately 800 people perished.

After Riga was captured by Russian forces, the Citadel was restored. It housed supplies of food and weapons sufficient for a 30,000-strong army, as well as gunpowder magazines and even windmills. Wooden buildings were gradually replaced with stone ones, some of which survive today. During a reconstruction led by Alexander Vilboa (1769), a regular layout was implemented with a central square and buildings arranged by function. Near the square, an Eastern Orthodox St. Peter and St. Paul Church (1781–1786), a commandant’s house, a guardhouse, a spacious artillery arsenal (1799–1801, demolished in 1965), and residential buildings for officers were constructed. Wooden soldiers’ barracks lined the perimeter along the ramparts.

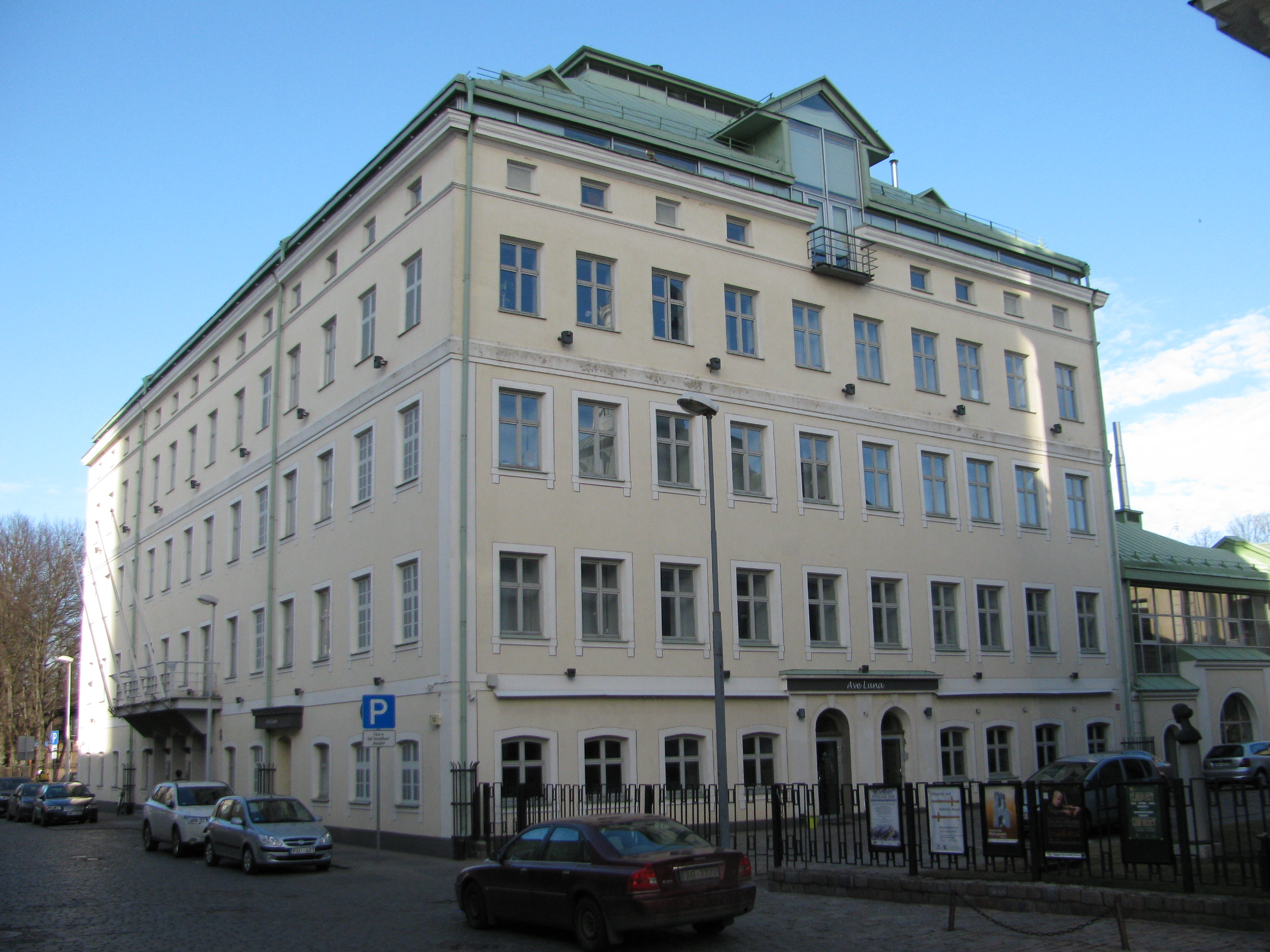
Former Riga Provincial Prison

One of the most prominent structures in the Citadel was the three-story “disciplinary house” (Riga Provincial Prison), built in 1786–1789. This building, with an additional floor added in the second half of the 19th century, still stands today (Citadeles Street 12) and is recognized as a state-protected architectural monument.

On 18 August 1804, the first human flight in a hot air balloon over Latvian territory took place from the Citadel’s grounds (Liege aeronaut Étienne-Gaspard Robert flew about 20 kilometers northeast).

In the 1850s, the Citadel, along with other Riga fortifications, was slated for demolition as part of the 1857 reconstruction project. It was officially decommissioned as a fortress on 22 June 1867. In 1871, the Citadel’s fortifications and esplanades were transferred to the city, except for areas occupied by the theological seminary (now the Anatomikum), a timber yard by the city canal, and transporters’ sheds in the current Forburg quarter on Ausēkļa Street. Between 1872 and 1875, the Citadel’s defensive ramparts were leveled, and the surrounding moats were filled in (one section of the fortress moat was preserved and connected to the city canal, linking it to the Daugava). The adjacent territory was landscaped according to a plan by Riga engineer and surveyor Richard Stegman. The Royal Gates, made of granite and iron, were incorporated into the Riga Castle near the early 19th-century stables. However, most of the Citadel’s buildings remained under military ownership, which refused to sell them to provincial authorities until World War I.

Riga Citadel in Historical Images

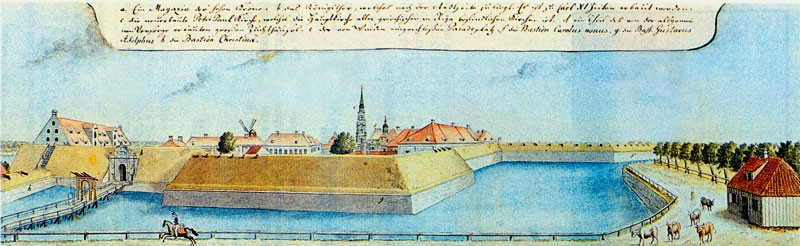
View of the Citadel from the city in the late 18th century. Drawing by Johann Christoph Brotze

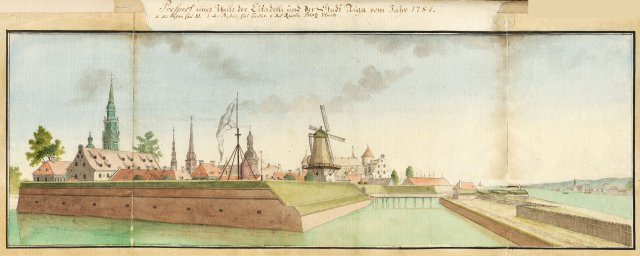
View of the Citadel from the north. Drawing by J. C. Brotze (1784)
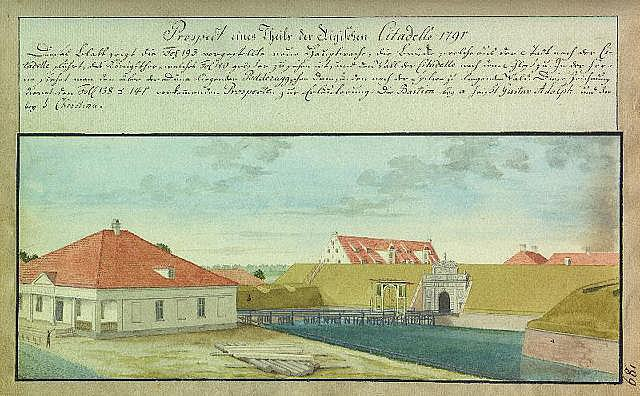
Entrance to the Citadel. Drawing by J. C. Brotze (1791)

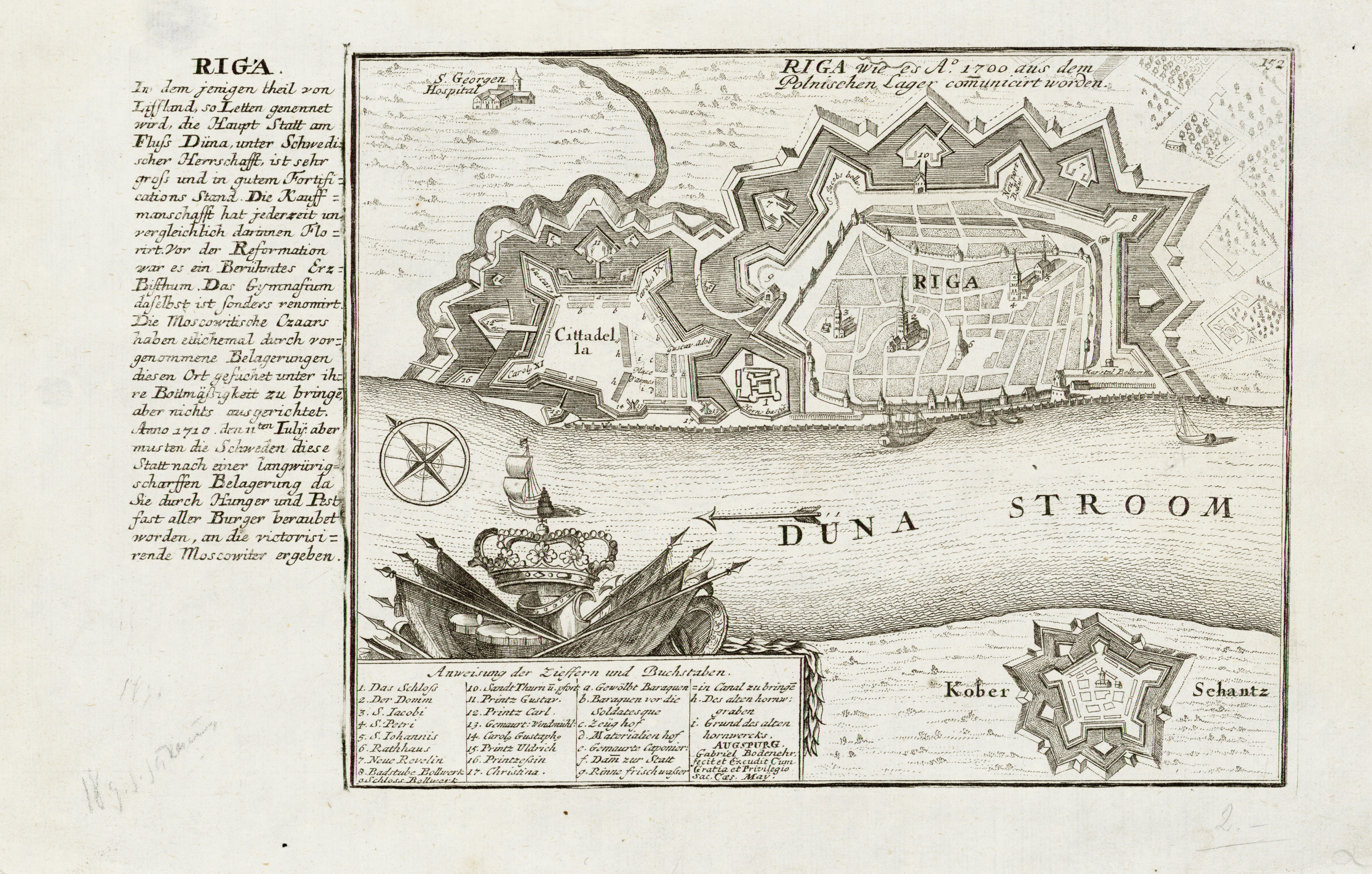
Riga fortifications in a 1700 plan

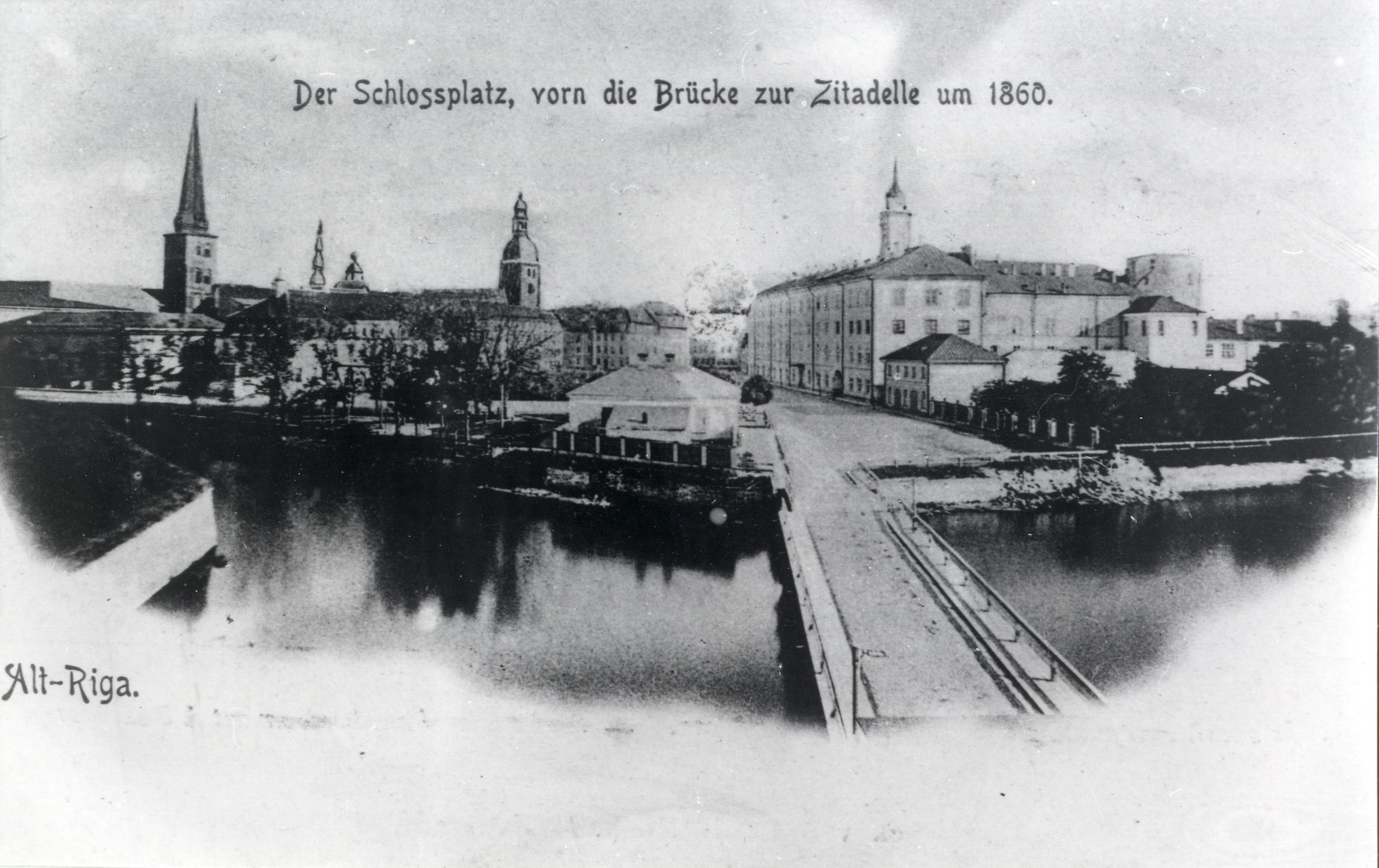
View from the Citadel toward Castle Square. Photo from 1860

== Current state ==
In 1965, architects Edgars Pučiņš, Kārlis Alksnis, Viktor Dorofeev developed a project for a government center for the Latvian Soviet Socialist Republic, which included three high-rise buildings (24, 20, and 19 stories) to be built on the former Citadel site. All surviving 17th–19th-century structures were slated for demolition due to their alleged dilapidation. The new government complex, designed for 7,000 workers, was to be located on a spacious Republic Square, envisioned as the city’s main public square for mass demonstrations, military, and sports parades. The square was to face the Daugava embankment, separated by a green zone. A monument commemorating the 50th anniversary of the October Revolution was planned for Republic Square, with a foundation stone laid on the Daugava bank (removed in the late 1980s).

For various reasons, the original project was not fully realized. Only the high-rise building of the Ministry of Agriculture (1968–1978, architects A. A. Reinfelds, V. P. Kadirakov, and V. M. Maike) was constructed on the site of the Citadel’s arsenal and commandant’s house; several historical buildings were preserved. In the 1970s–1980s, a group of architects led by Imants Jākobsons repeatedly revisited plans for the unbuilt structures, including proposing a scaled-down high-rise complex, but this idea was not supported. In the early 21st century, Republic Square saw the construction of the modern Parex Banka building (now Citadele Bank; 2003–2008, architect Meinhard von Gerkan—No. 2A) and the so-called “Center House” (2002–2005, architects Uģis Šēnbergs and Martinus Schuurman—No. 3).

The St. Peter and St. Paul Church was renovated in 1986–1987 as a concert hall for the chamber choir Ave Sol (architect M.-E. A. Mengele) and continues to serve this purpose, though since 2012, it has also hosted occasional religious services.

In 1990, a bust of Anna Kern, the muse of Alexander Pushkin, was erected near the walls of the St. Peter and St. Paul Church (sculptors Līgita Ulmane and Ojārs Breģis). Anna’s husband, E. F. Kern, served as the commandant of the Riga Fortress from 1823 to 1827 and lived with his wife in the Citadel during this period, frequently traveling to Saint Petersburg. In memory of the Kern family, a residential complex named “Kern Residences” was built in the Citadel area in 2017 (Citadeles Street 6).

The legacy of the Riga Citadel lives on in the name of Citadeles Street and the well-known Latvian bank Citadele Banka, both located on the site of the former fortress.

Modern Views of the Citadel

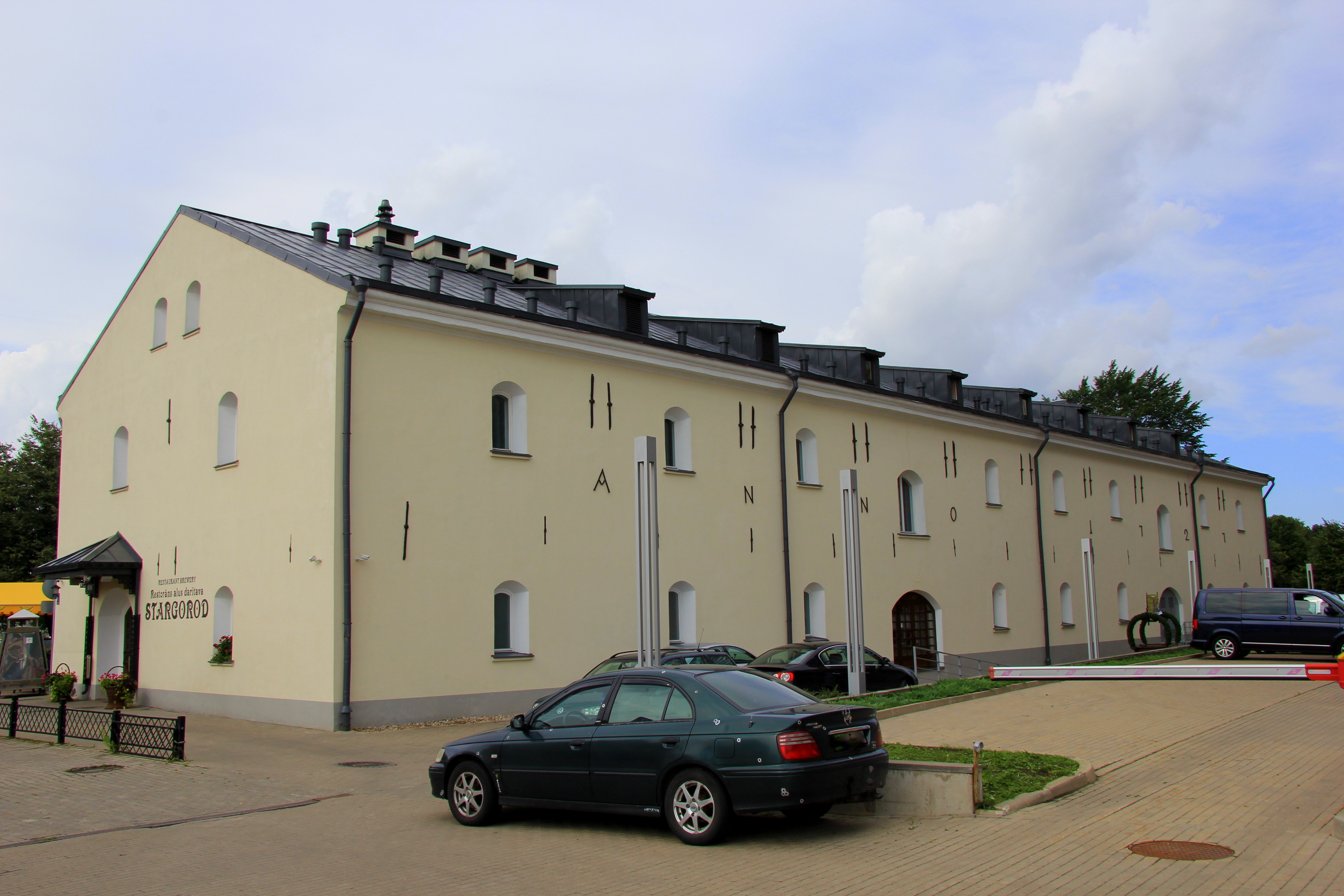
One of the preserved Citadel warehouses

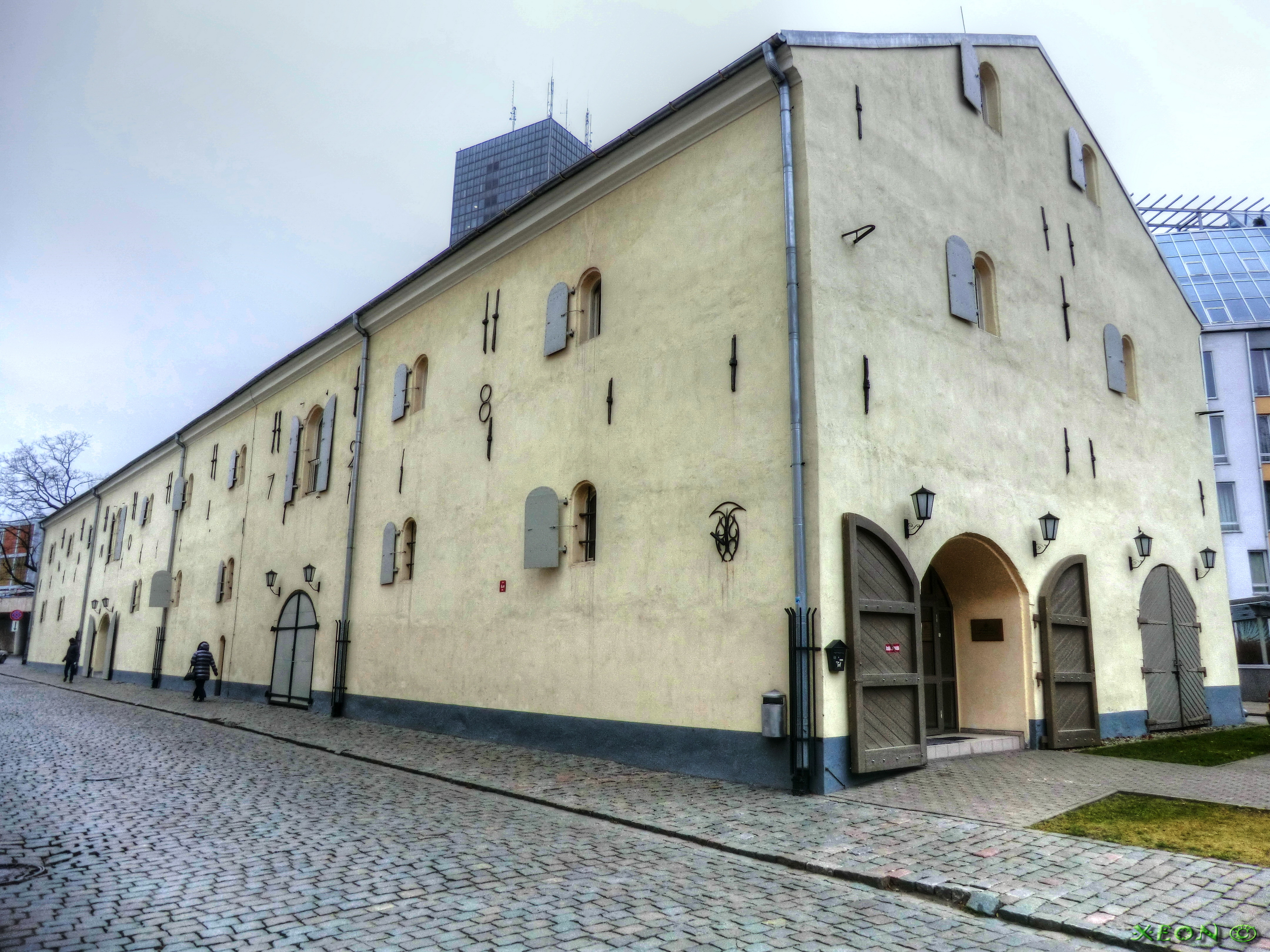
Another preserved warehouse

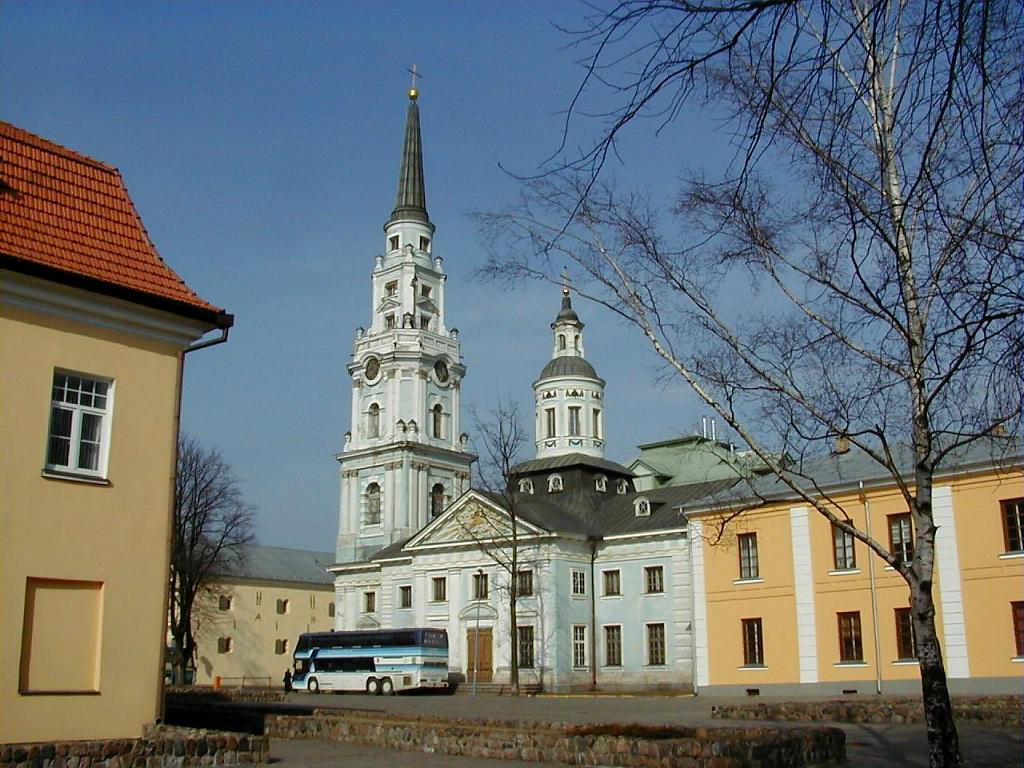
View of the St. Peter and St. Paul Church
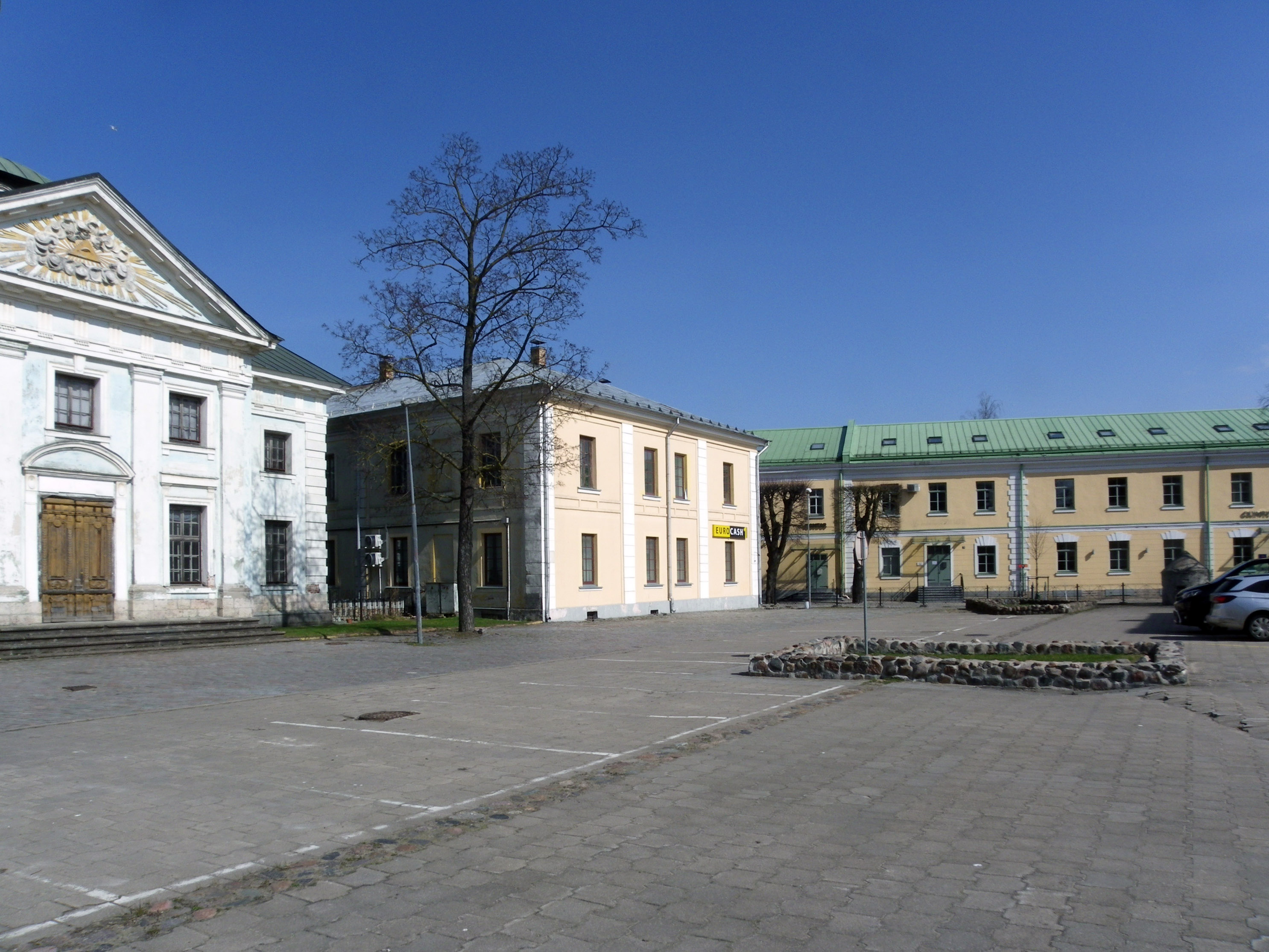
Central square of the Citadel

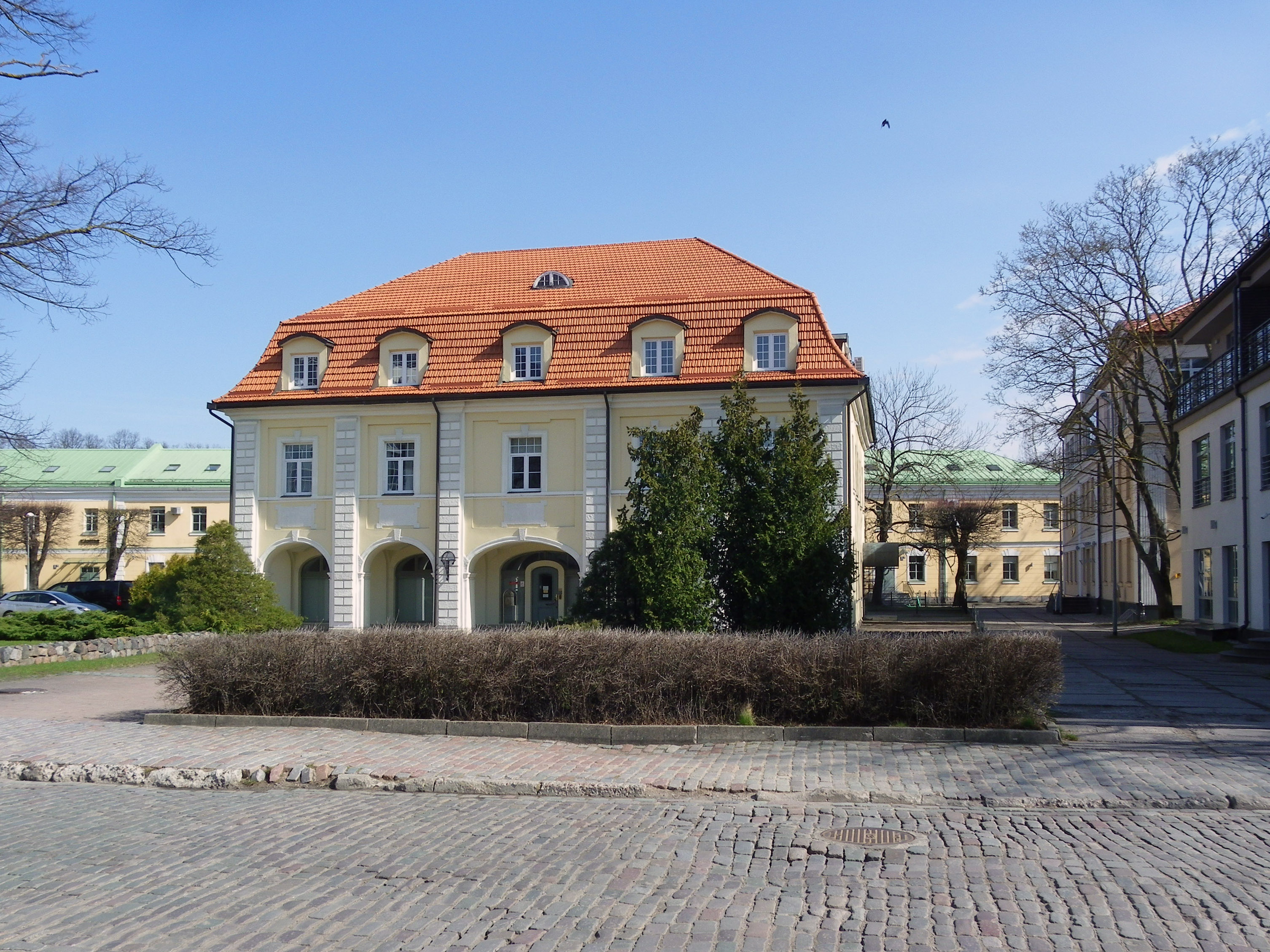
Former guardhouse, now the Patent Office of the Republic of Latvia

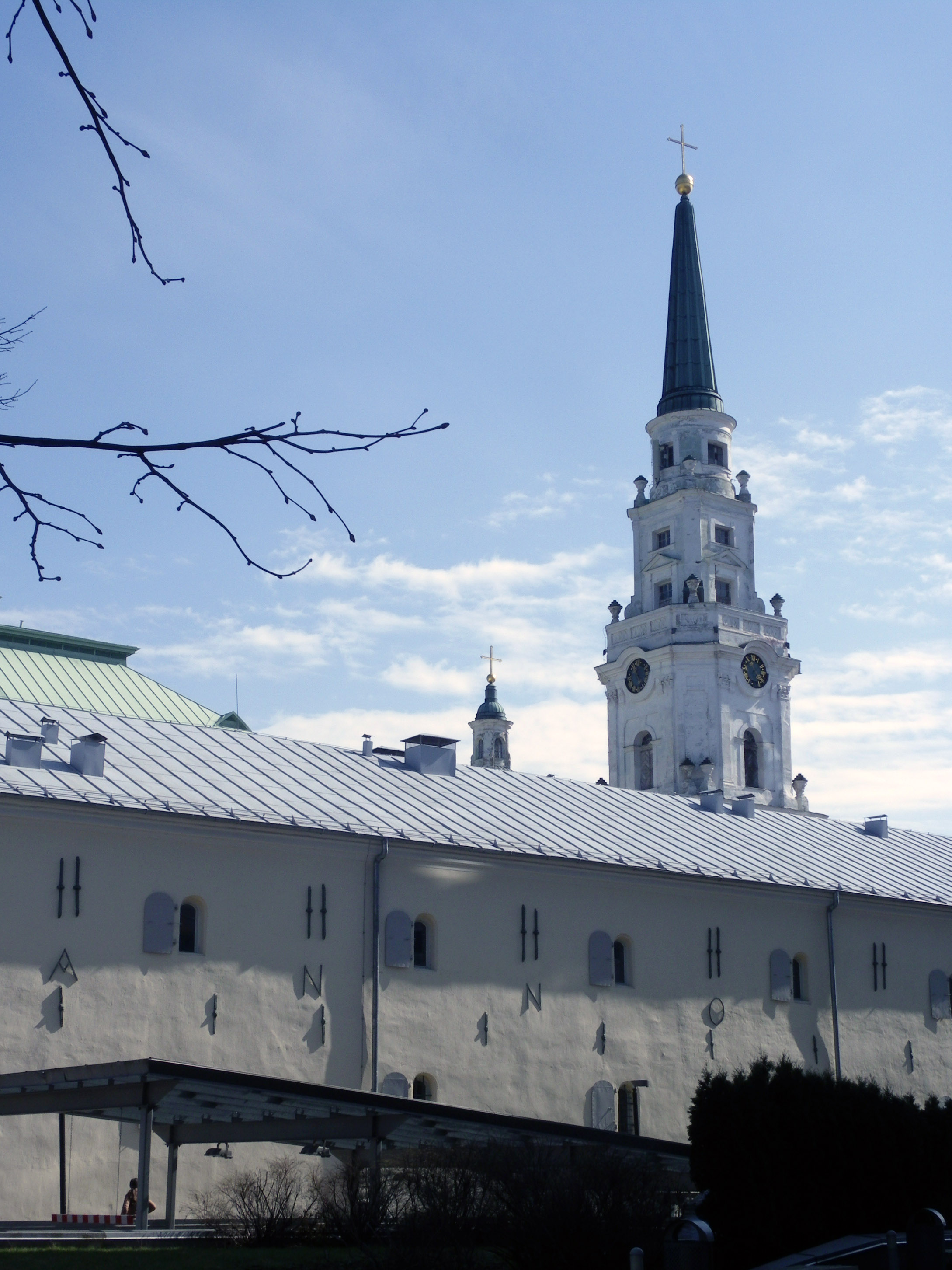
View from Miķeļa Street

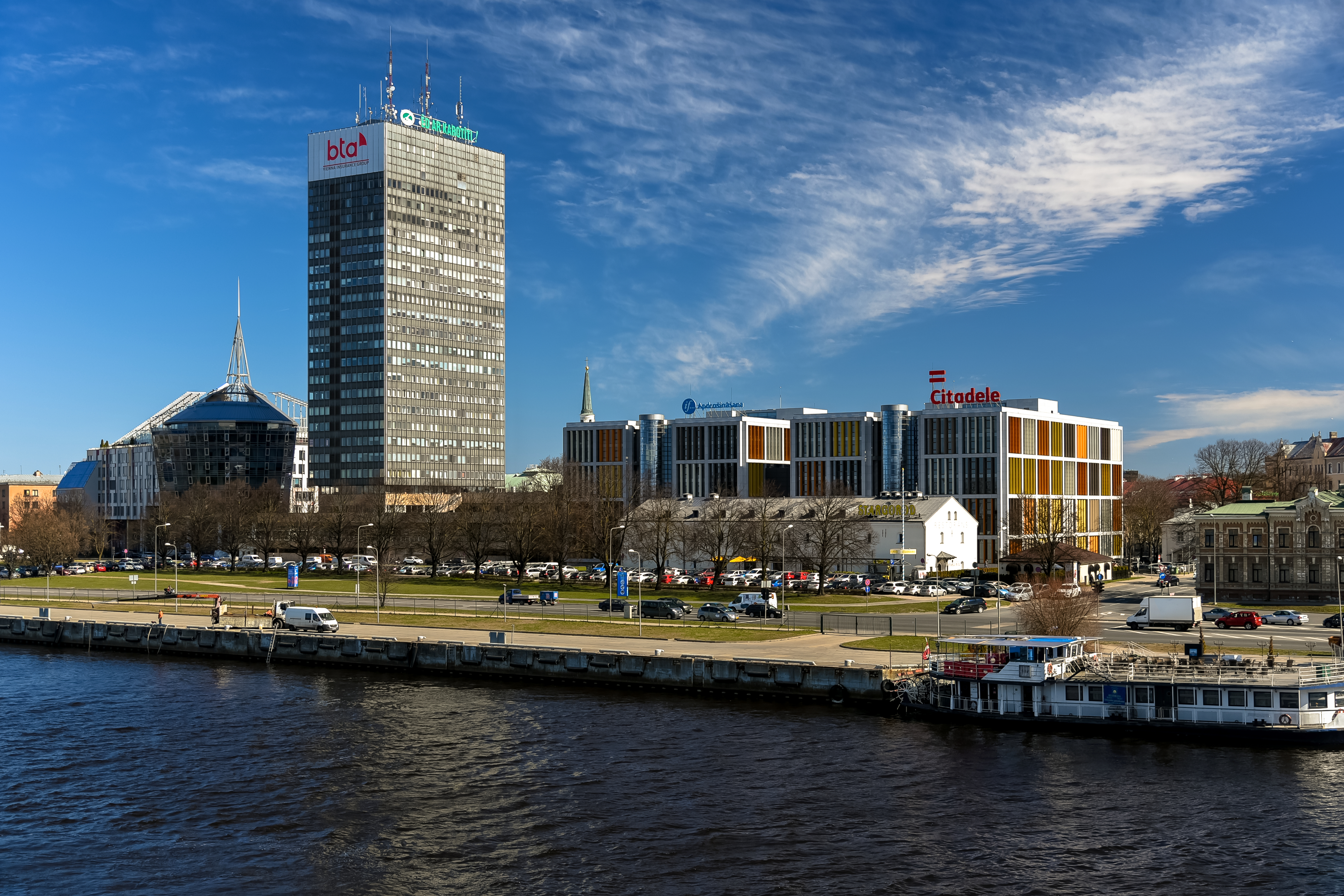
View of the Citadel site from the embankment
