= Ministry of Agriculture (Latvia) =

- Latvijas Republikas Zemkopības ministrija
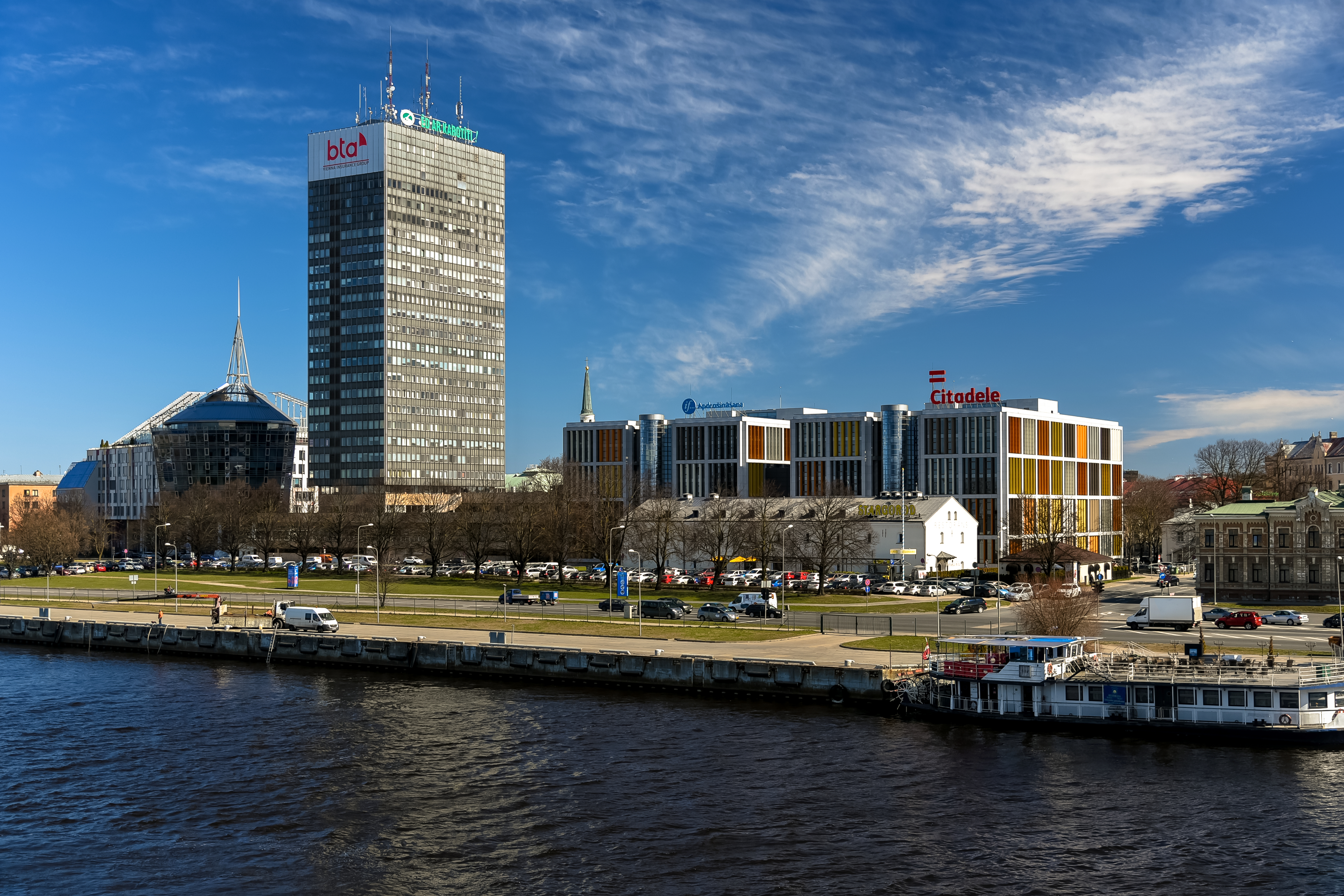
- The Ministry of Agriculture Building in Riga

Agency overview
- Formed: 19 November 1918 (restored 31 July 1990)
- Type: Ministry
- Jurisdiction: Government of Latvia
- Headquarters: Republikas laukums 2, Riga, LV-1981; 56.9544°N 24.0993°E
- Employees: 206 (2019)
- Minister responsible: Reinis Uzulnieks, Minister of Agriculture
- Website: www.zm.gov.lv/en

The Ministry of Agriculture of the Republic of Latvia (Latvian: Latvijas Republikas Zemkopības ministrija) is the state administration institution in Latvia responsible for developing and implementing national policy in agriculture, forestry, fisheries, and rural development.

The administrative head of the ministry is the State Secretary, while the political head is the Minister of Agriculture. The ministry is headquartered in a landmark socialist modernist high-rise building at Republikas laukums 2 in Riga.

== History ==
The ministry was originally established as the Ministry of Agriculture of the Republic of Latvia on 19 November 1918, immediately following the proclamation of the Republic of Latvia. Following the Soviet occupation of Latvia in 1940, the ministry was dissolved. The Soviet occupation authorities established the People's Commissariat of Agriculture of the Latvian SSR in August 1940, which was renamed the Ministry of Agriculture of the Latvian SSR on 24 March 1946. It underwent further restructuring during the Soviet era, operating as the Ministry of Agriculture and Procurement (1953) and the Ministry of Agricultural Product Production and Procurement (1962–1965) before returning to its previous name.

Following the restoration of Latvia's independence, the modern ministry was re-established on 31 July 1990 by decision of the Council of Ministers of the Republic of Latvia under the name Ministry of Agriculture (Latvian: Lauksaimniecības ministrija). In its initial years, the ministry was tasked with managing agrarian reforms, transition to market-based prices, and rebuilding the national land cadastre system.

On 1 August 1993, the ministry was renamed to its current Latvian name, *Zemkopības ministrija* (officially translated as the Ministry of Agriculture). Structural reorganizations in 1997 created dedicated departments for agricultural strategy and cooperation, product quality management, and market policy. In 2000, the Rural Support Service (LAD) was established to manage regional administrations and coordinate the distribution of agricultural funds.

== Structure ==
The Ministry of Agriculture comprises several specialized departments:

- Department of Agriculture
- Department of Forestry
- Department of Fisheries
- Department of Veterinary and Food
- Department of International Affairs and Strategic Analysis
- Legal Department
- Department of Budget and Finance
- Department of Rural Development Support
- Department of Market and Direct Support
- Administrative Department

== Subordinate institutions ==
The Ministry of Agriculture oversees several state administration offices, scientific institutes, and educational establishments:

- Rural Support Service (Latvian: Lauku atbalsta dienests – LAD): Distributes state and European Union agricultural funding.
- State Forest Service (Latvian: Valsts meža dienests – VMD): Monitors and regulates the management of forests in Latvia.
- State Plant Protection Service (Latvian: Valsts augu aizsardzības dienests – VAAD): Monitors crop health and regulates phytosanitary controls.
- Agricultural Data Centre (Latvian: Lauksaimniecības datu centrs – LDC): Oversees registers for livestock, pets, and breeding certificates.
- Latvia University of Life Sciences and Technologies (Latvian: Latvijas Biozinātņu un tehnoloģiju universitāte – LBTU, formerly Latvijas Lauksaimniecības universitāte): High educational institution specialized in agricultural sciences and forestry.
- State Agency for Technical Supervision (Latvian: Valsts tehniskās uzraudzības aģentūra – VTUA): Oversees heavy agricultural and forestry machinery registers and operations.
- Latvian State Forest Research Institute "Silava" (Latvian: Latvijas Valsts mežzinātnes institūts "Silava"): Main national forest research organization.
- Food and Veterinary Service (Latvian: Pārtikas un veterinārais dienests – PVD): Monitors food safety and animal health.
- Institute of Food Safety, Animal Health and Environment "BIOR" (Latvian: Pārtikas drošības, dzīvnieku veselības un vides zinātniskais institūts "BIOR"): National scientific institute providing research and laboratory testing for food safety and animal health.

=== State-owned enterprises ===
The Ministry of Agriculture is the shareholder or manager of several state-owned limited liability and joint-stock companies:

- Zemkopības ministrijas nekustamie īpašumi (ZMNĪ): State real estate and melioration systems management company.
- Meliorprojekts: Undertakes drainage and soil improvement project planning.
- Latvian Rural Advisory and Training Centre (Latvian: Latvijas Lauku konsultāciju un izglītības centrs – LLKC): Provides consultation and agricultural education to businesses.
- Latvian State Forests (Latvian: Latvijas valsts meži – LVM): State-owned joint-stock company managing and commercializing public forests.
- Jaunmoku Castle Ltd. (Latvian: Jaunmoku pils): Manages the historic Jaunmoku Castle and park complex.

== See also ==
- Ministry of Agriculture Building
- Government of Latvia
