= Radisson Blu Hotel Latvija =

Skyscraper in Riga, Latvia

General information
- Status: Completed
- Type: Hotel
- Location: Elizabetes iela 55, Riga, Latvia
- Coordinates: 56.95506°N 24.11781°E
- Construction started: 1967
- Completed: 1979
- Renovated: 2001
- Owner: Linstow International

Height
- Roof: 95 m (312 ft)

Technical details
- Structural system: Reinforced concrete
- Floor count: 27
- Floor area: 24,000 m^{2} (258,000 sq ft)

Design and construction
- Architects: Arturs Reinfelds, Aija Grīna & Walters Maike
- Structural engineer: Edmunds Valeinis
- Main contractor: Henryjs Lācis

The Radisson Blu Hotel Latvija is a high-rise hotel in the Vidzeme Suburb of Riga, Latvia. Built between 1967 and 1979 and renovated in 2001, the tower stands at 95 m (312 ft) tall with 27 floors and is the current sixth tallest building in Latvia.

== History ==
The building is 85.65 meters high (from floor level to roof), the structural height of the building is 98.26 meters (including the decorative construction on the roof). With a total area of 24,000 m^{2} (258,000 sq ft), the building is the largest hotel in Latvia. The building was completed in 1976, but was reconstructed in 2001. During the Soviet era, the hotel was named Hotel Latvija.

The first ideas for the construction of a new hotel appeared already in the early 1960s, when architect I. Strautmanis presented a sketch for a 10-story hotel "Intūrista" in 1962 on the site of the restaurant "Esplanāde" and "Piena restorānas" at the corner of Brīvības (then Lenin) and Elizabetes (then Kirova) streets. This is the location of the Vērmaņi family house, which was sold after the death of its last owner, Johannes von Vērmaņi (1850–1893).

Over time, the project was revised and the building's height reached 23 floors. An ironically apt comment on this topic was published in the magazine "Literatūra un Māksla" in 1968:" "The 23 floors of the Hotel Latvija are a much stronger accent than the ten planned in the reconstruction proposal...".

Although there was opposition from some architects and residents to the demolition of old buildings in the block where the high-rise building was to be built between Brīvības, Dzirnavu, Baznīcas and Elizabetes streets, this was not taken into account and the buildings were demolished. Only the building at Baznīcas street 4 was preserved, which after the reconstruction of the high-rise building carried out in 2001 and the second stage of the reconstruction in 2004–2006 was renovated and won third place in the competition "Best Building of the Year 2008" - in the nomination "Best Reconstruction of the Year".

Hotel Latvija was the highest category "B" hotel of the USSR State Committee for Foreign Tourism, with 680 rooms. The hotel was intended to serve organized foreign and Soviet tourist groups with tourist tickets. The hotel had a conference hall with 80 seats and simultaneous translation booths, radio and video equipment. The high-rise building also had a restaurant complex with 876 seats, souvenir and newspaper kiosks, a post office, a utility complex, as well as a currency exchange office of the State Bank. A KGB telephone tapping node was installed on the upper floors of the Hotel Latvija.

=== Construction ===
Construction work began in mid-1967. On December 11, 1967, at 9:30 a.m., the first dump truck with a load of concrete arrived at the construction site and concreting of the foundations of the "Latvija" hotel began, which lasted 5 days. The "Latvija" hotel celebrated its rafter festival at the end of December 1971, but construction was completed in 1976. In turn, it was put into operation only on December 29, 1978. The architects of the high-rise building are Artūrs Reinfelds, Aija Grīna, Valters Maike, as well as constructor Henrijs Lācis and engineer Edmunds Valeinis. The original design building was 26 floors high, which was covered by a two-story extension with an entrance lobby, cafe, restaurant, shop, as well as the "Latvija" exhibition hall. The interior was designed by a collective of artists led by Ojārs Ābols. A kinetic object "Sakta" (The Pin) designed by Artūrs Riņķis was also used for the facade of the building.

In the foundation, 220 reinforced concrete piles were driven into an area of 760 square meters to a depth of 8 meters. Then, a thousand cubic meters of concrete were poured into the ground, creating the monolithic foundation slab of the hotel.

=== Renovation ===
In 1998, the hotel was completely renovated. The reconstruction was divided into two phases, the first of which involved the reconstruction of the high-rise building, and the second phase involved the extension of the building complex. The first phase of the reconstruction began in 2000 and was completed within 10 months in May 2001. 26 subcontractors were involved in the work. The estimated cost of the first phase of the reconstruction was 25 million US dollars. the hotel was renamed Reval Hotel Latvija.

The second phase of the reconstruction of the complex took place from 2004 to 2006, while the demolition of the old exhibition hall "Latvija" building began in 2003. As a result of the second phase of the reconstruction, a completely new, 6-storey hotel block with 200 new hotel rooms, a one-storey glass shopping arcade, and a large and multifunctional conference hall with 1,000 seats were built.

After the completion of both phases of reconstruction, the total area of the building reached 24,000 m^{2} (258,000 sq ft), making it the largest hotel in Latvia. The number of floors in the building increased from 24 to 27 floors.

The hotel was rebranded as Radisson Blu Hotel Latvija in 2011.

== See also ==
- List of tallest buildings in Latvia
- List of tallest buildings in the Baltic states
