= Lygumai =

- Town
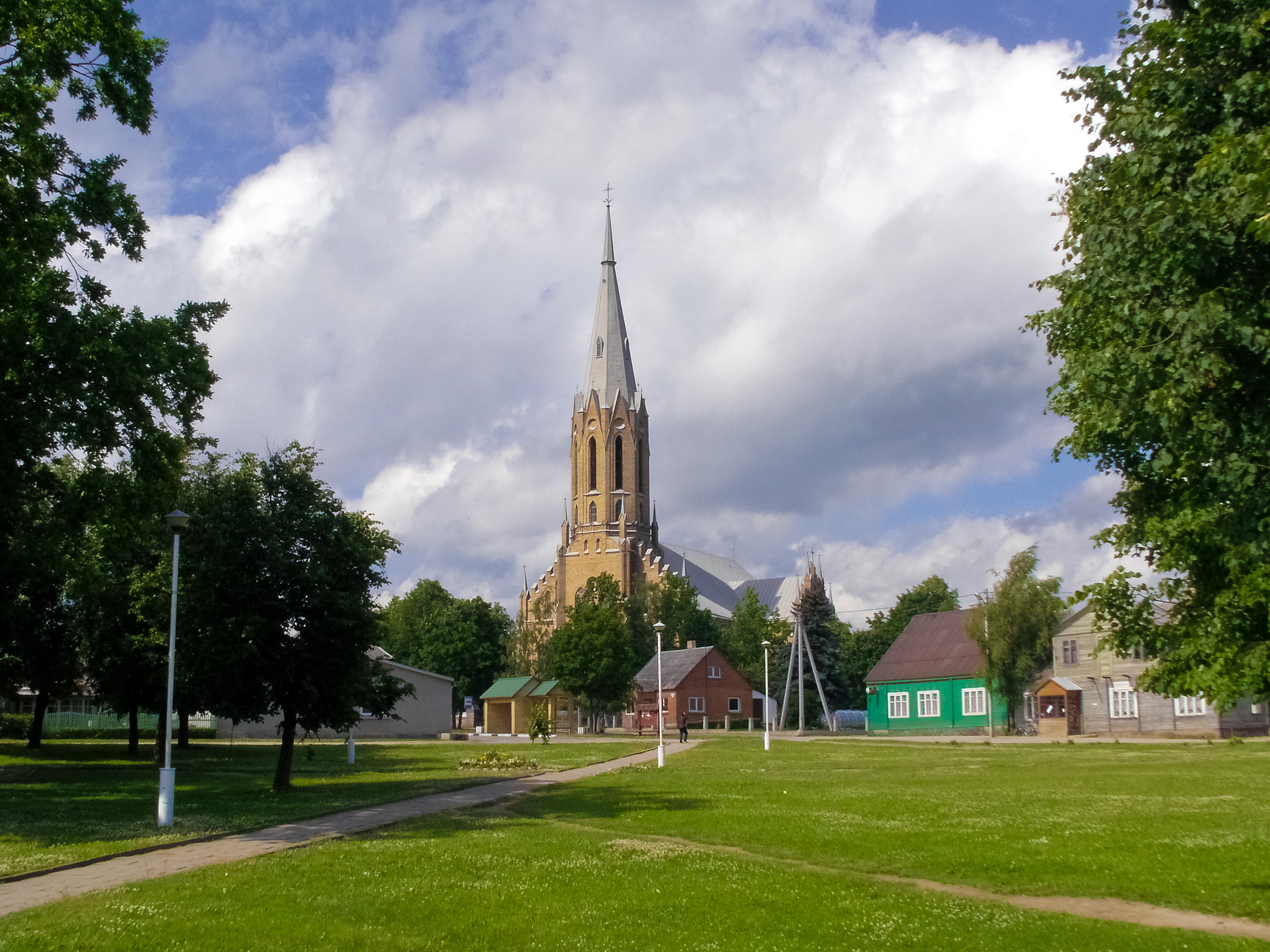
- Central square

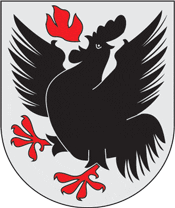
- Coat of arms

- Location in Lithuania
- Coordinates: 56°0′20″N 23°39′30″E
- Country: Lithuania
- Ethnographic region: Samogitia
- County: Šiauliai County

Population (2011)
  - Total: 601
- Time zone: UTC+2 (EET)
  - Summer (DST): UTC+3 (EEST)

Lygumai (Yiddish: ליגעם) is a small town in Pakruojis District Municipality, Šiauliai County, northern-central Lithuania. As of 2011 it had a population of 601. It is the administrative center of the Lygumai elderate.

== History ==
In 15th century the Lygumai estate of the Grand Duke of Lithuania was mentioned.

Within the Polish-Lithuanian Commonwealth the place was also known under the Polonized name Ligumy. It is known that the place was given by Stanisław II August to a royal geometer (surveyor) Czapski for the general survey of royal table estates and later changed owners several times.

In the beginning of August 1941, during the German occupation of Lithuania, the Jews of the village, about 80 men and over 100 women and children were mass murdered. The mass execution was perpetrated by German Einsatzgruppen and local collaborators.

== Elderate ==
Major villages of the elderate (over 100 inhabitants, as of Lithuanian Census of 2011) include Šukioniai, Stačiūnai, Dvariškiai, Degučiai, and Kauksnujai.

== Attractions ==
The present building of the Lygumai parish Holy Trinity Church was constructed during 1902–1915. It is listed among the tallest buildings of Lithuania. Its exact height was measured in 2016 and found to be 73.84 meters, including the 3-meter top cross.
