= Latvijas valsts meži =

Latvian state-owned forestry company

AS Latvijas valsts meži
- Trade name: Latvijas valsts meži
- Native name: Akciju sabiedrība "Latvijas valsts meži"
- Type: State-owned joint-stock company
- Industry: Forestry
- Founded: 1999
- Headquarters: Vaiņodes iela 1, Riga, Latvia
- Area served: Latvia
- Revenue: €604.8 million (2025)
- Net income: €206.6 million (2025)
- Total assets: €919.6 million (2025)
- Owner: Republic of Latvia (100%; shares held by the Ministry of Agriculture)
- Number of employees: 1,451 average (2025)
- Website: www.lvm.lv

Latvijas valsts meži (LVM; literally "Latvia's State Forests") is a Latvian state-owned forestry company. It manages and protects state-owned forest land in Latvia and is wholly owned by the Republic of Latvia, with the state's shares held by the Ministry of Agriculture. LVM manages about 1.61 million hectares of land, including about 1.59 million hectares of forest land. In 2025, the company reported revenue of €604.8 million and profit of €206.6 million.

== History and legal status ==
The Cabinet of Ministers of Latvia ordered the establishment of the non-privatizable state joint-stock company Latvijas valsts meži on 24 September 1999 to manage state forest property. The company was registered on 28 October 1999.

Under Latvia's Forest Law, state forest land registered in the name of the Ministry of Agriculture is managed and protected by AS "Latvijas valsts meži". The same law provides that the company's shares may not be privatized or alienated.

A 2015 OECD review of Latvia's state-owned enterprises described LVM as one of the largest state-owned enterprises in the government's portfolio and noted that the company had been established to preserve the value of state forests and generate profit for the state.

== Operations ==
LVM's core activity is the management of state-owned forests and other state land. Its annual report describes forestry as the company's main business area, while other activities include forest-tree seeds and seedlings, mineral materials, recreation and hunting services, land leases and geospatial information-technology services.

In 2025, revenue from contracts with customers was €604.8 million. Sales of roundwood assortments were the largest revenue category, amounting to €557.5 million. An academic study of Latvian forests described LVM as the manager of state-owned forests and identified recreation infrastructure, such as paths, observation towers, picnic places and cultural nature objects, as part of the social value of forest land.

LVM has also been involved in renewable-energy development on state forest land. In 2022, Latvenergo and LVM announced plans for joint wind-power projects with a planned capacity of about 800 MW and expected annual output of around 2.4 TWh. In 2024, LVM transferred its 20% share in SIA Latvijas vēja parki to Latvenergo, leaving Latvenergo as the sole owner of the wind-park development company.

== Economic role ==
LVM is classified by the State Chancellery of Latvia as a large state-owned enterprise in the forestry and agriculture sector. In the 2024 TOP101 valuation list compiled by Prudentia and Nasdaq Riga, LVM was ranked as the third most valuable company in Latvia, with an estimated value of €1.657 billion.

A 2019 Lursoft study summarized by Jauns.lv identified LVM as the largest forestry-sector company in Latvia by 2017 turnover and profit, and described the company as manager of 1.63 million hectares of land at that time. Public Broadcasting of Latvia reported in 2015 that the company's profit for 2014 had exceeded earlier expectations.

== Audits and environmental issues ==
In 2016, Public Broadcasting of Latvia reported that four of LVM's eight forest regions had lost Forest Stewardship Council certification for responsible forest management, while the company retained a certificate confirming the legal origin of the timber it sold.

In 2026, the State Audit Office published an audit of state forest management. The report described LVM as managing a state resource comprising 47% of Latvia's forests and concluded that improvements were needed in the oversight and management of the company. The audit also found that a decision to reduce prices in certain long-term timber contracts led to a €49.4 million revenue reduction in 2024–2026, and it issued eight recommendations to the Ministry of Agriculture and LVM. Public Broadcasting of Latvia, summarizing the audit, also reported that at least €130.3 million had not been transferred to the state budget as additional dividend payments.

== See also ==
- Latvenergo
- State-owned enterprise
