= St. Peter and St. Paul Church, Riga =

Church in Riga, Latvia

Coordinates: 56°57′18.19″N 24°6′4.25″E

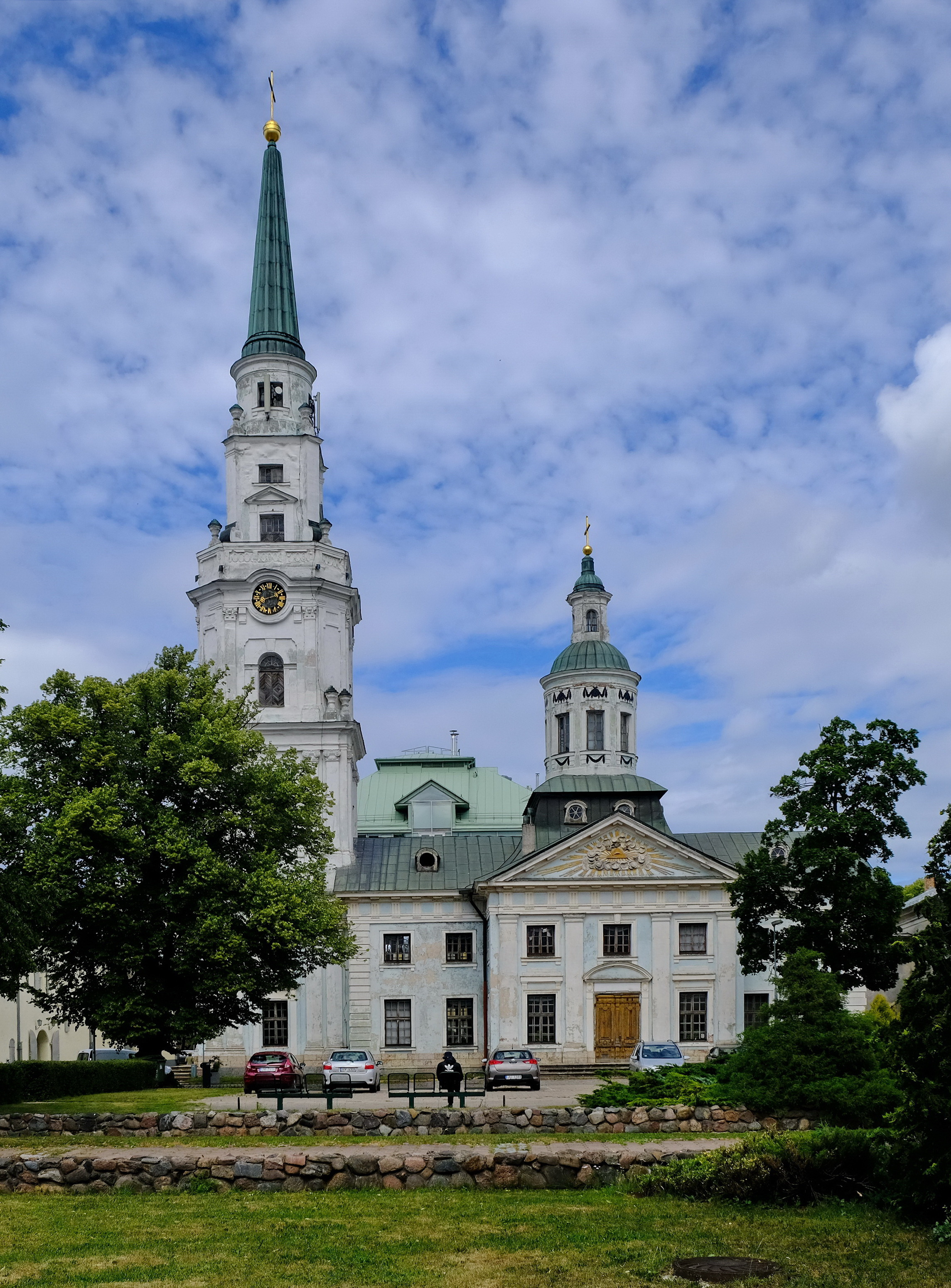
The church in 2019

St. Peter and St. Paul Church (Latvian: Svētā Pētera un Pāvila pareizticīgo baznīca) is the oldest Orthodox church surviving in Riga, the capital of Latvia. The church is situated at the address Citadeles iela 7.

The church was built in the 1780s and served the Russian garrison stationed in the Riga Citadel. The Soviet regime turned it into the "Ave Sol" concert hall. In 2012, the building was returned to the Latvian Orthodox Church.
