= Zunda Towers =

Twin skyscrapers in Riga, Latvia

- The towers seen from Raņķa dambis
- Interactive map of the Zunda Towers area
- Former names: Z-Towers

General information
- Location: Riga, Latvia
- Coordinates: 56.9473°N 24.08007°E
- Named for: Zunda Canal

Height
- Height: 123 m (404 ft) and 117 m (384 ft)

Design and construction
- Architects: F.L.Tadao & Lukševics and Helmut Jahn

The Zunda Towers (formerly known as the Z-Towers) are a pair of skyscrapers in Riga, Latvia. The buildings were designed by Latvian architectural firm F.L.Tadao & Lukševics, while the façade was designed by architect Helmut Jahn. Both towers have a mix of office space and residential units.

The total cost of the project was more than €250 million. The towers were completed in 2017, and opened a few years later.

== Buildings ==
The complex consists of two cylindrical towers, covered in glass. The taller of the two towers rises to a height of 123 m (404 ft), while the second tops out at 117 m (384 ft). Both of the buildings are 30 stories high, and are joined at the base by 5 publicly accessible floors. The complex houses 336 apartments, has 10,000 m^{2} (100,000 sq ft) of office space, and includes parking space for 700 cars.

== Development ==
The project was first established in 2004. At one point, the complex was planned to be a hotel managed by Starwood, owner of the Sheraton hotel chain, and was scheduled for completion in 2010. The construction project took over 13 years to complete, and cost more than €250 million. The towers were completed in 2017.

Yuri Shefler, a Russian billionaire who heads the SPI Group, is one of the main proponents of the project. The SPI Group owns the Stolichnaya brand of vodka, which is made in Latvia. It also has an interest in Latvijas Balzams, Latvia's largest producer of alcoholic beverages. Shefler has previously publicly expressed his opposition to Russian president Vladimir Putin's regime, and conducts his business in Latvia to avoid the Russian political environment.

== Marketing ==
The building complex was originally marketed toward people from Russia and other nations of the Commonwealth of Independent States who were looking for access to the European Union and its banking system. The website for the project also had instructions for potential clients on how to obtain residency via the purchase of real estate. However, after Russia invaded Ukraine in 2022, these instructions were no longer available at the project website. In addition, because of the later association of the letter "Z" with the Russian military, the towers were renamed to avoid being associated with the Russian aggression. (Note: The letter "Z" was originally chosen to highlight the complex's location near the Zunda Canal.)

== Gallery ==
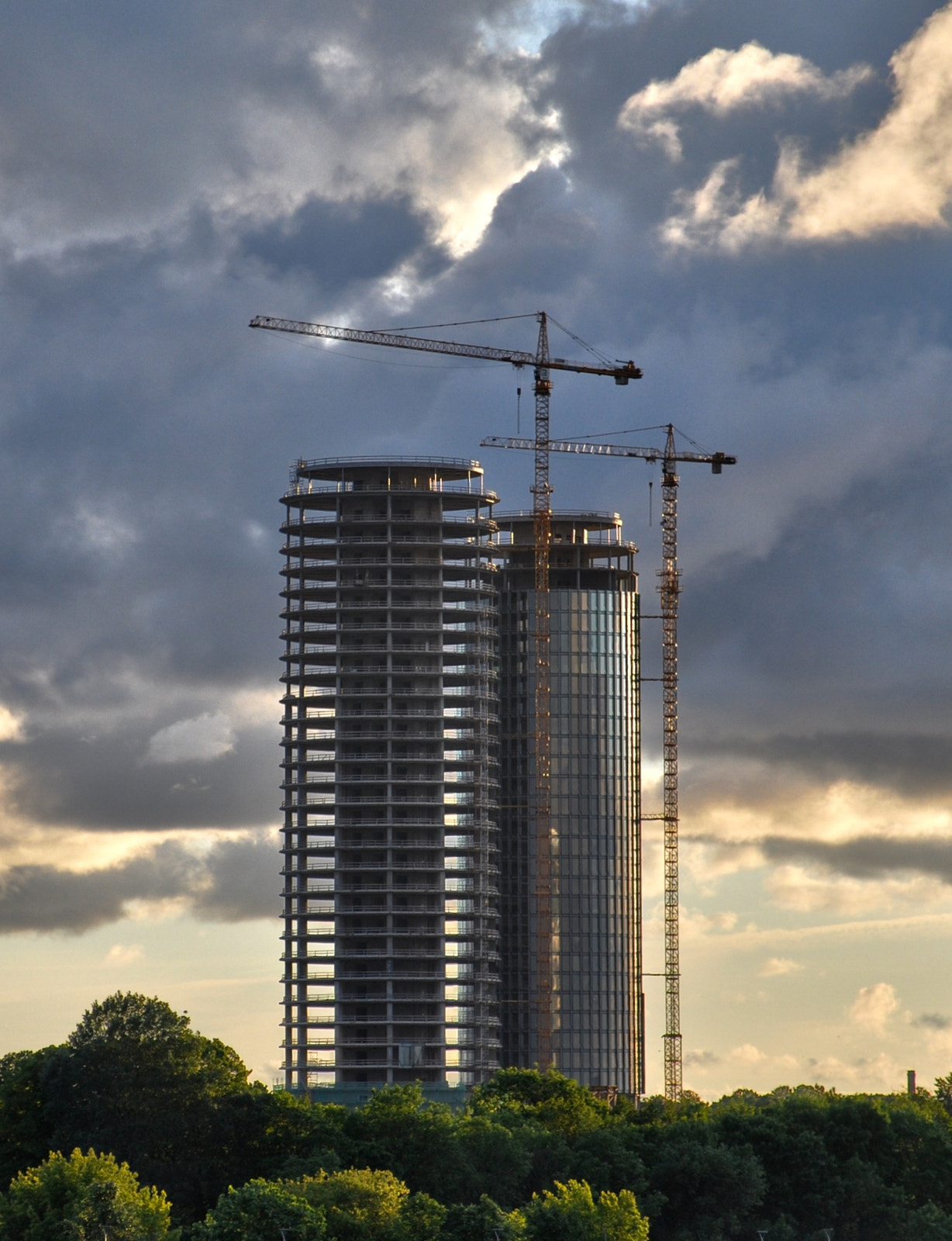
Under construction

In front of the Zunds Canal

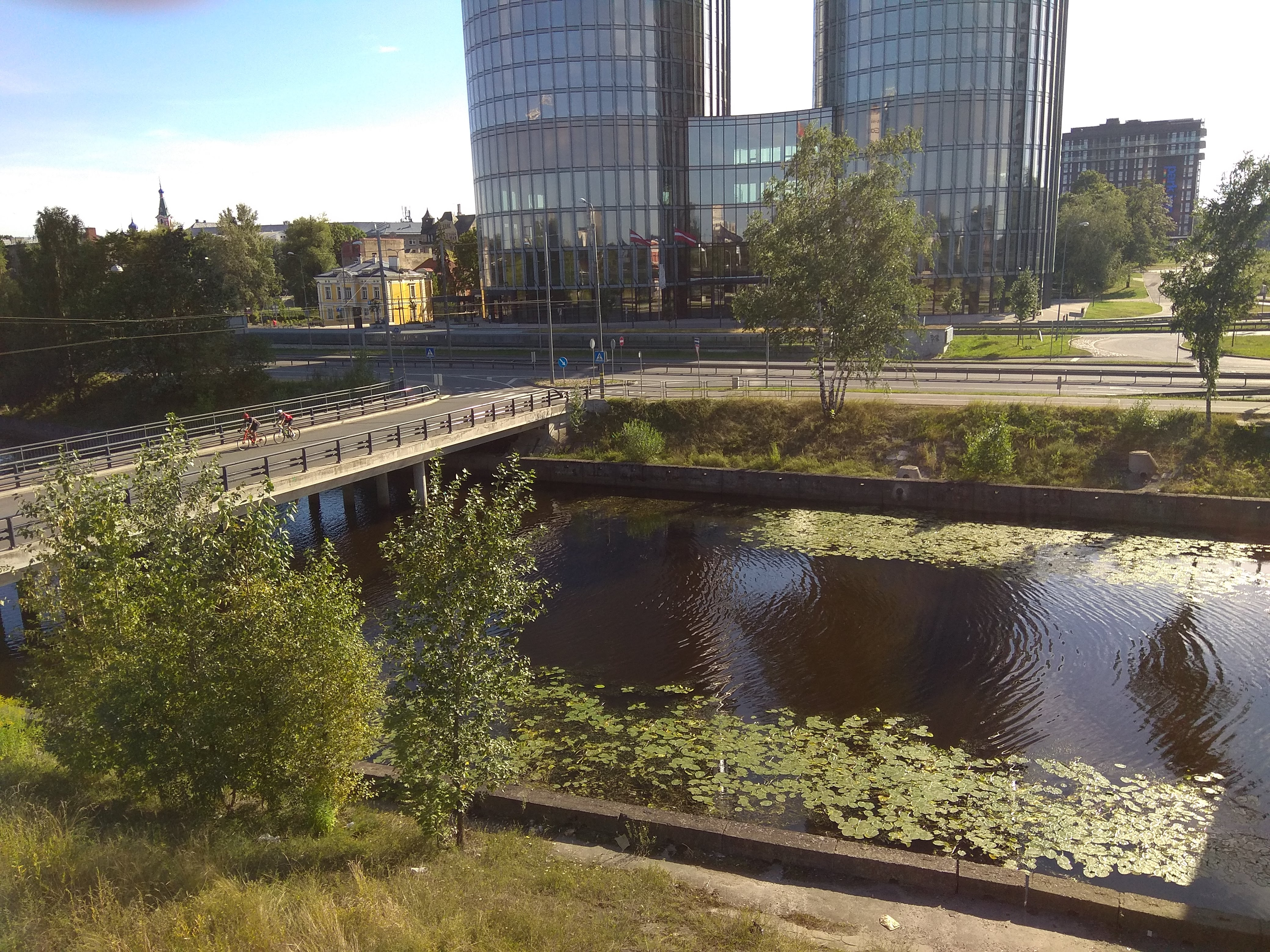
Lower floors bridging the towers
