= Kuršas (building) =

General information
- Status: On hold
- Location: Klaipėda, Lithuania
- Coordinates: 55.6923°N 21.15°E
- Estimated completion: unknown

Height
- Roof: 170 m (560 ft)

Technical details
- Floor count: 40

Kuršas was a proposed skyscraper in Gandrališkės, Klaipėda, Lithuania. If completed, the skyscraper would be the tallest residential building in the Baltic States. Designed by Donatas Rakauskas. The building is named after Courland in Latvia.

The building was approved by the city council in May 2009, but due to the global recession the project was put on hold.

== See also ==
- Vilnius TV Tower
- Pilsotas
- List of buildings
- Tallest buildings in Lithuania
- List of the world's tallest structures
- List of tallest buildings and structures by country
