= Constitution Avenue (disambiguation) =

Constitution Avenue is a major east-west street in the city of Washington, D.C., USA.

Constitution Avenue may refer to:

- Constitution Avenue, Canberra, a street in Canberra, Australia
- Constitution Avenue (Islamabad), a street in Islamabad, Pakistan
- Constitution Avenue, Vilnius (Konstitucijos Avenue), a street in Vilnius, Lithuania

== See also ==
- U.S. Route 50, a US highway which includes Constitution Avenue
