= White Bridge (Vilnius) =

Bridge in Vilnius, Lithuania

White Bridge Baltasis Tiltas
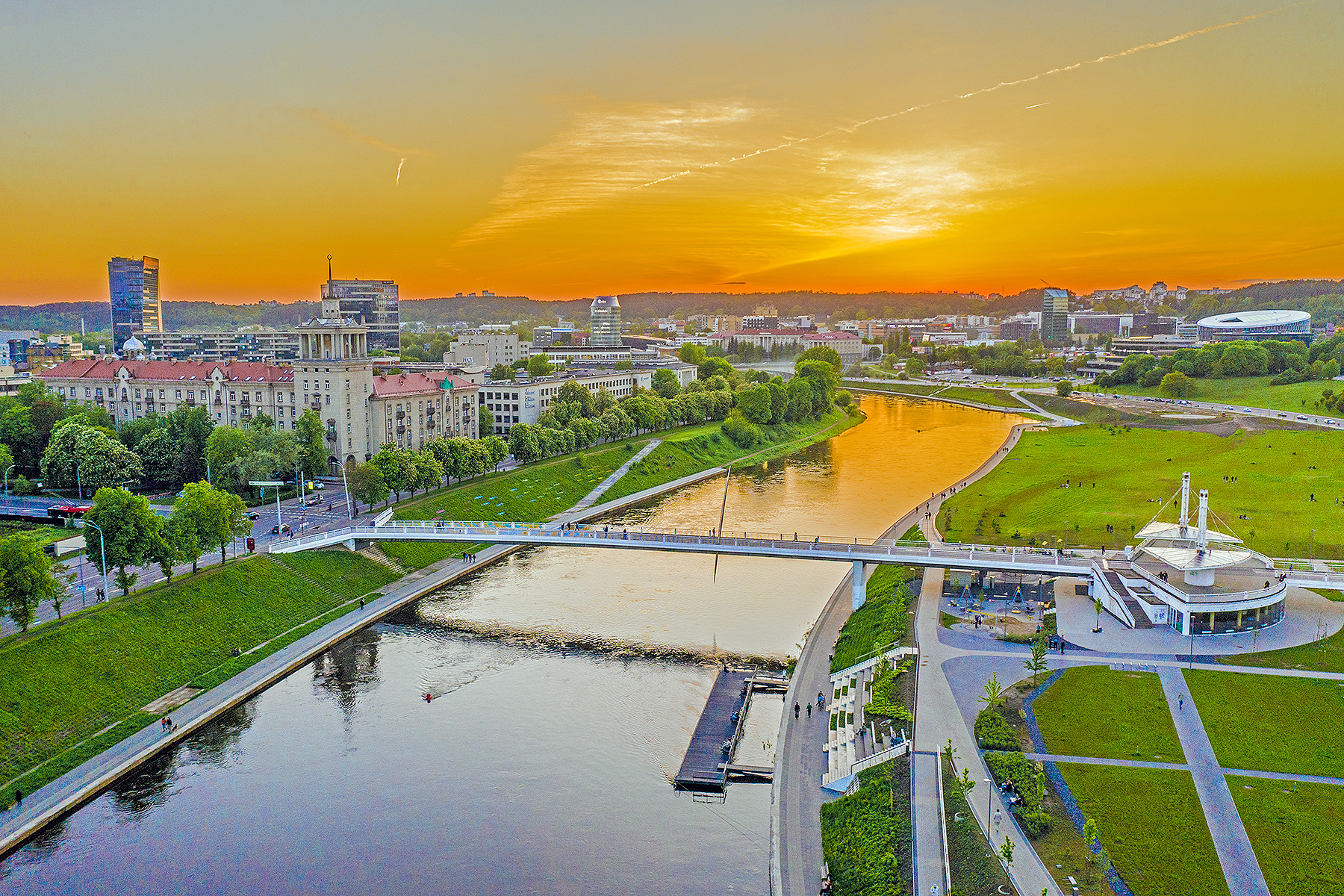
- Coordinates: 54°41′35″N 25°16′23″E
- Crosses: Neris River
- Locale: Vilnius
- Preceded by: Green Bridge
- Followed by: Iron Wolf Bridge

Characteristics
- Total length: 240 metres (790 ft)
- Width: 6 metres (20 ft)
- Height: 11.4 metres (37 ft)

History
- Construction end: 1996

Location
- Interactive map of White Bridge

The White Bridge (Lithuanian: Baltasis tiltas) is a pedestrian bridge over the Neris River in Vilnius, Lithuania. It connects Naujamiestis with Vilnius CBD and Šnipiškės. The bridge was built in 1996.

== Activities and infrastructure ==
On the western side, the bridge hosts Baltas Tiltas Food Hall which offers drinks, snacks and small restaurants with different cuisines as well as outdoor seating. Caffeine coffee shop and Iki Express convenience store are on the eastern side.

There is a White Bridge sports field next to the bridge, which hosts 9 beach volleyball courts, 3 double-sided basketball courts, a park for roller skaters and skateboarders, outdoor training grounds and children playgrounds. The whole area is 8.36 ha (20.7 acres).

Concerts, festivals and other entertainment activities are regularly hosted in a field near the White Bridge, including the largest laser light show in Lithuania.

== Sculpture ==
The bridge is decorated with a sculpture called Spindulys-Ietis (transl. Ray Spear).

== Gallery ==
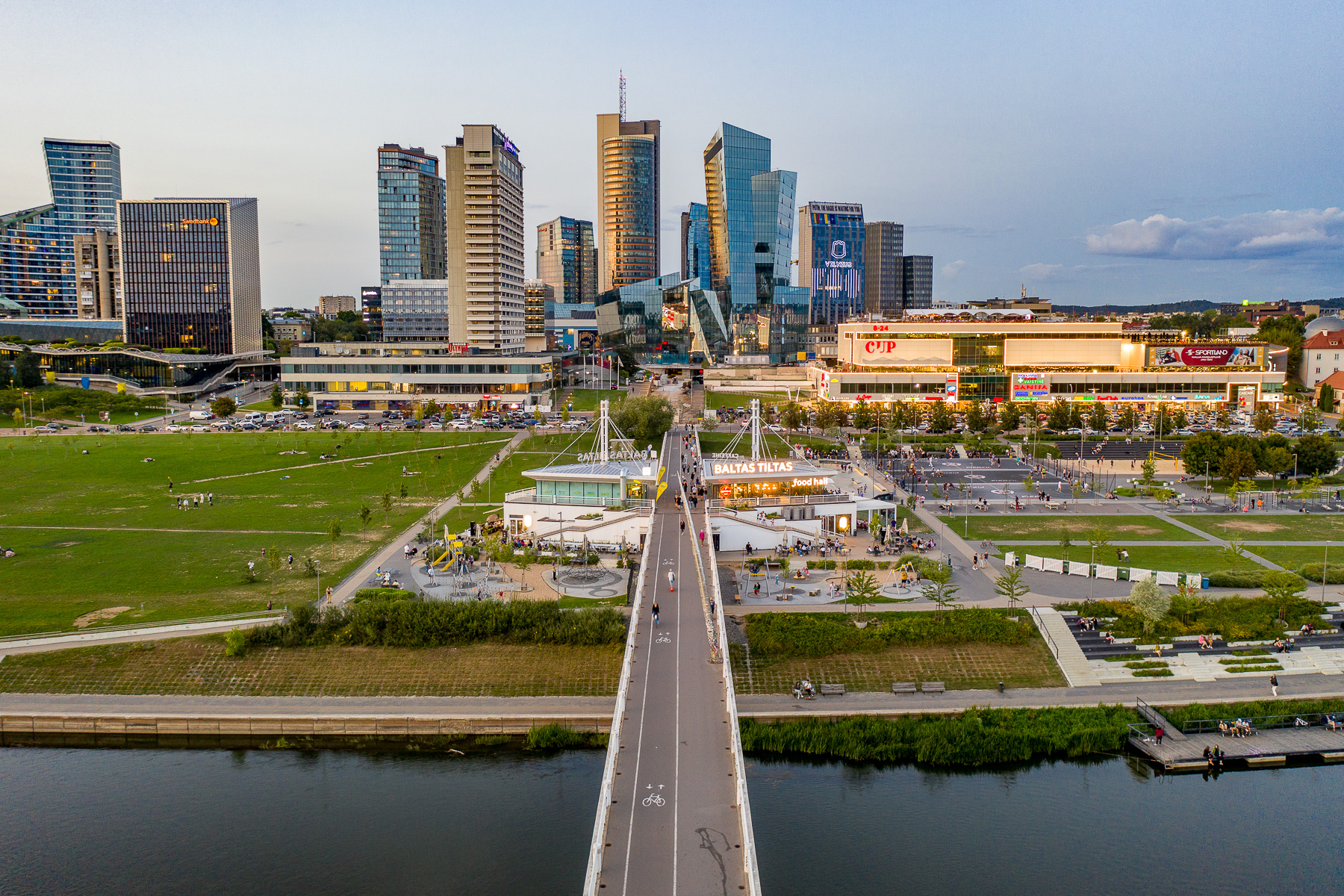
View of Vilnius CBD in 2023

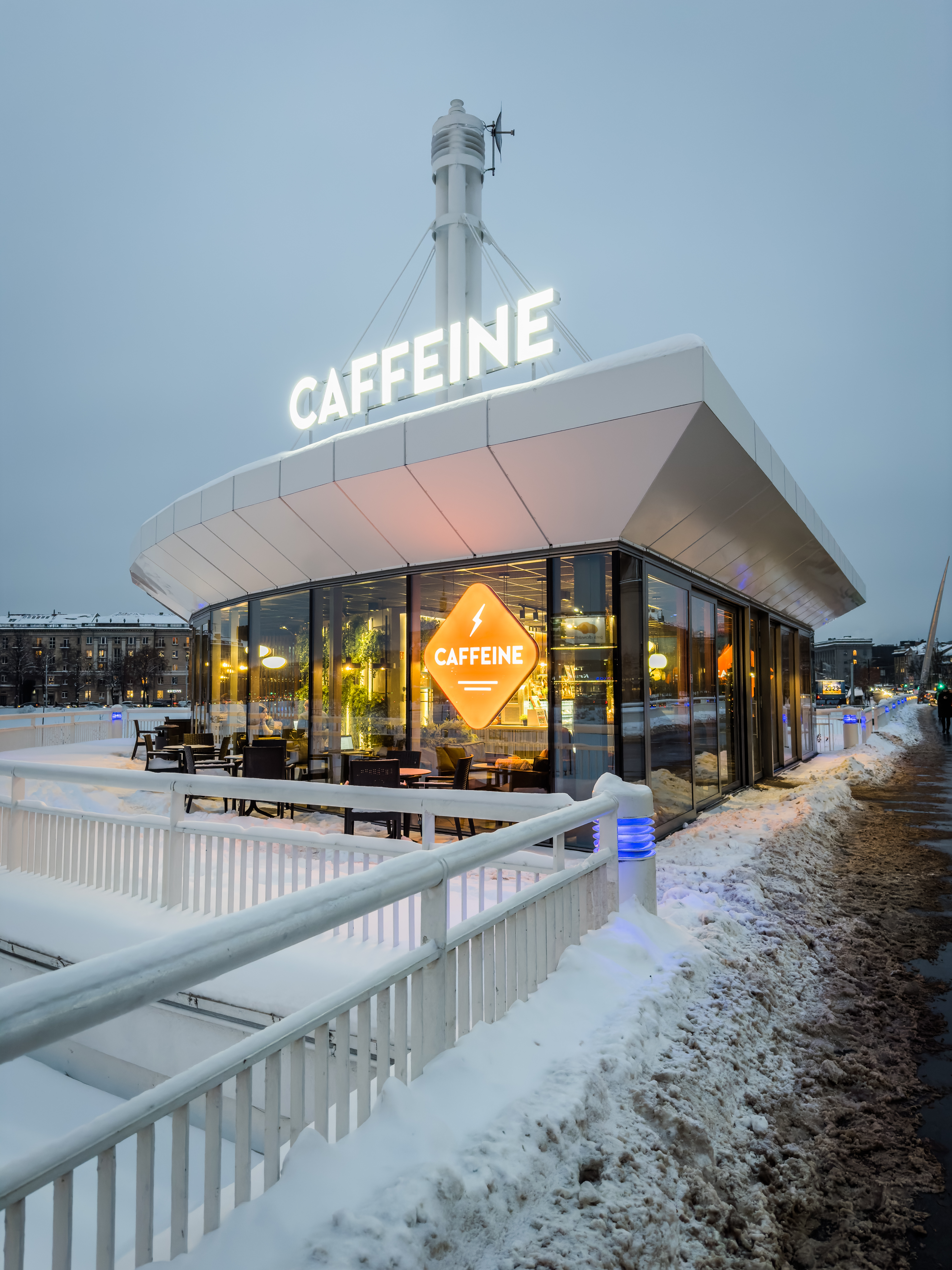
Café on the bridge in December 2022

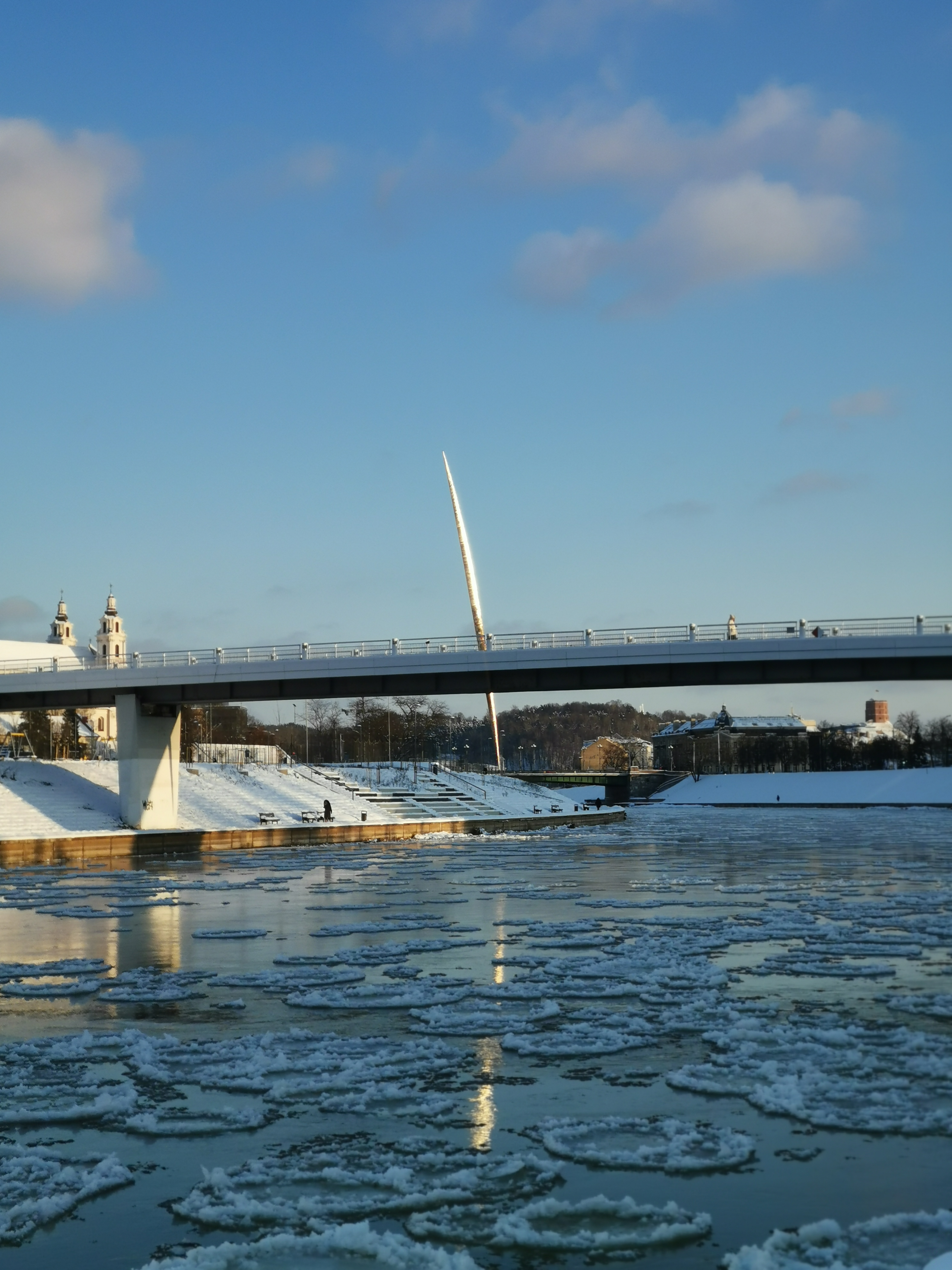
Bridge with the sculpture at the centre (January 2021)

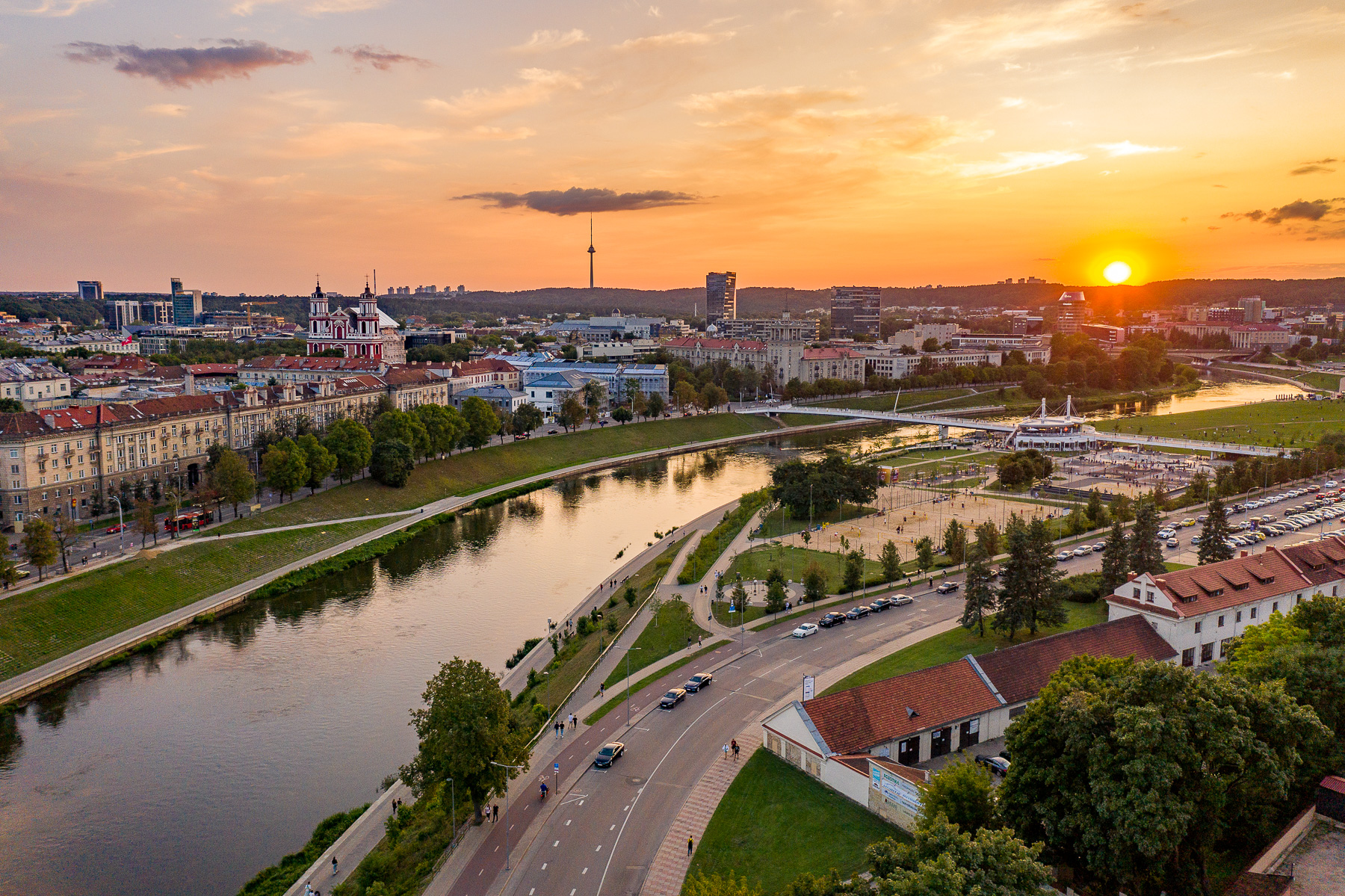
Side-view of the bridge in 2023
