= Šauliai =

Šauliai may refer to:

- Lithuanian Riflemen's Union
- Šauliai (Klaipėda), neighborhood of Klaipėda, Lithuania
- Šauliai (Šalčininkai), a locality in Šalčininkai District Municipality, Lithuania
- A locality in Pagėgiai Municipality, Lithuania
