= Kuršas =

Kuršas is Lithuanian name for:

- Courland - historical region of Latvia and Lithuania Lithuanian: kuršas.
- Kuršas a building in Klaipėda, Lithuania.
