= Sigita Daugule =

Latvian painter and art scientist

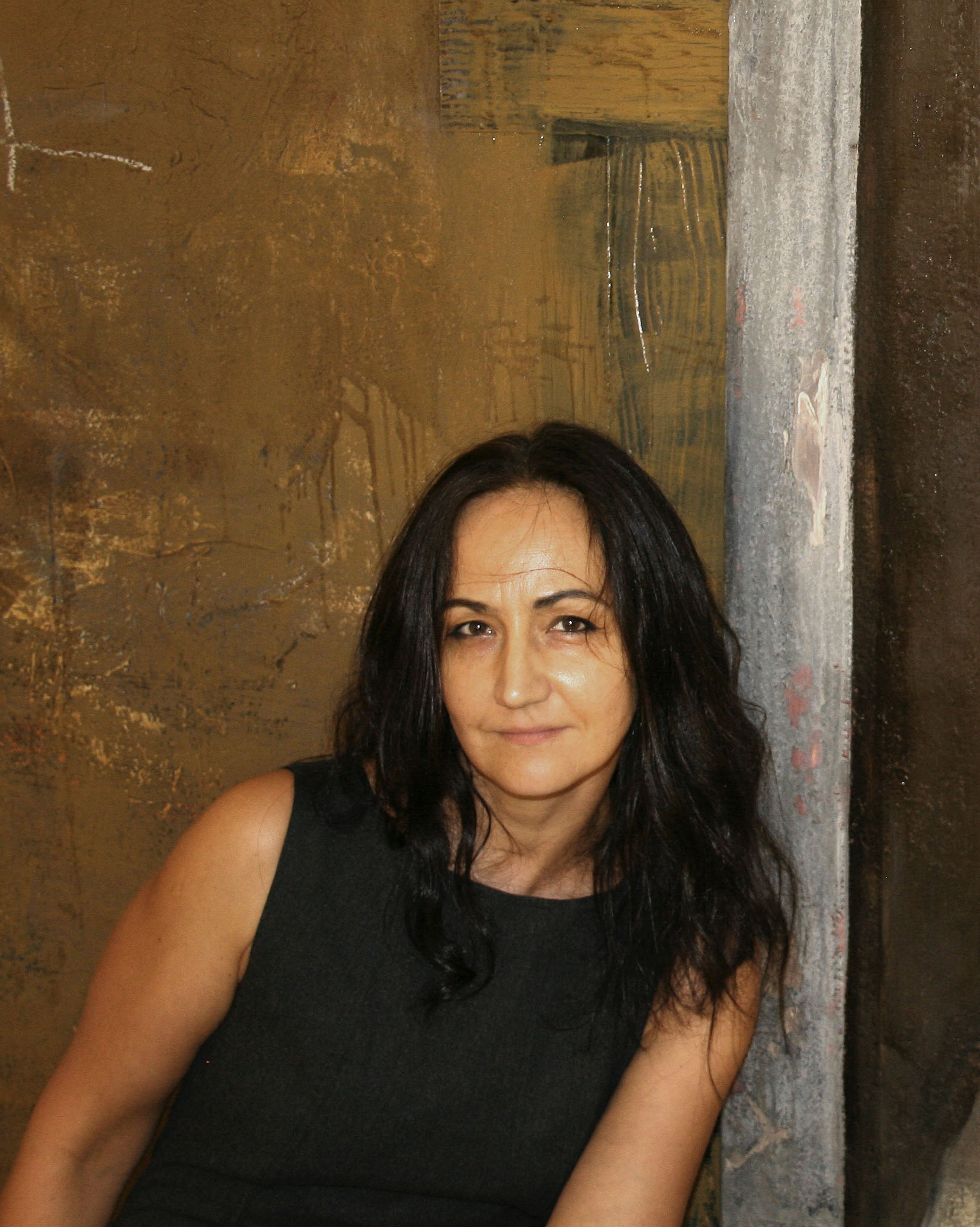
Artist Sigita Daugule. / Photo: Signe Vanadzina

Sigita Daugule (born 19 February 1971 in Riga) is a Latvian painter and art scientist. One of the most critically acclaimed contemporary Latvian artists both in Latvia and abroad.

== Biography and creative work ==
Sigita Daugule was born into family of electrical engineers Liene and Huberts Daugulis.

She graduated from the Riga Secondary School No 50 (1978—1989). After graduating, she started studying at the Painting Department of the Art Academy of Latvia (1992—1998), which she graduated with a master’s degree in arts at the workshop of mural paintings of Indulis Zariņš and Aleksejs Naumovs. After graduating from the Art Academy, Sigita Daugule has spent a large part of her creative life in Austria and Germany having obtained the scholarship KulturKontakt Austria in 1999 and 2000, which offered an opportunity to live in Vienna.

In 2008, her painting “Alise Aizspogulijā” (AliceThrough the Looking Glass) was awarded the prize of the Painting of the Year in the competition organised by Swedbank and Agija Sūna Art Gallery.

In 2010, Sigita Daugule became the first representative of Latvia to receive the professional growth scholarship of the artist residence programme quartier 21 in Vienna.

Paintings of Sigita Daugule can be found in such public collections as Latvian National Museum of Art collection, Swedbank collection of contemporary art, collection of the Daugavpils Mark Rothko Art Centre, Zuzāni collection, Luciano Benetton collection Imago Mundi. The artist’s works are also found in private collections in Latvia, Germany, Austria, Slovenia, Malta, Estonia, the USA, the United Kingdom and the Netherlands.

In 2012, Sigita Daugule was nominated for the Purvītis Prize with the solo exhibition “Façades and structures” at the Riga Art Space.

In 2015, the “Neputns” Publishing House published a book by Sigita Daugule about the painter Jānis Liepiņš (1894—1964) within the series “Latvian art classics”.

In 2017, the “Neputns” Publishing House published a book “Sigita Daugule” in Latvian and English; it is a biographic account about the artist (authors Dace Lamberga and Laima Slava).

A member of the Latvian Artists’ Union since 1998.

The co-author of the biography of Sigita Daugule writes that Daugule’s art is aimed at the observer, who is used to delve into and analyse art.

== Exhibitions ==
Since 1998, the artist has been regularly organising solo exhibitions. The Austrian scholarship KulturKontakt received in 1999 and 2000 laid the groundwork for opportunities to exhibit and establish contacts in the creative industry also abroad.

Sigita Daugule has organised 29 solo exhibitions in Latvia and abroad, among them in Seywald (Salzburg), Ulrike Hrobsky (Vienna), N. Malmede-Kunst (Cologne), Buchhandlung und Kunstsalon Franz Leuwer (Bremen), Mark Rothko Art Centre (Daugavpils), Gallery “Bastejs” (Riga), Agija Sūna Art Gallery (Riga) and other venues.

The artist has participated in more than 70 group exhibitions in Latvia, Germany, Austria, Slovenia, Estonia, France, Sweden, Belgium, South Korea.
