= Vilnius City Municipality Building =

- Vilniaus miesto savivaldybės pastatas

- Interactive map of the Vilnius City Municipality Building area

General information
- Status: Serves as a Vilnius city municipality office
- Type: Office
- Location: Vilnius, Lithuania, Konstitucijos av. 3
- Coordinates: 54°41′45.254″N 25°16′44.917″E
- Groundbreaking: 2002
- Inaugurated: 2004
- Cost: €21.3 million
- Owner: Vilnius city municipality

Height
- Height: 77 m (253 ft)

Technical details
- Floor count: 20
- Floor area: 16500 m^{2}

Design and construction
- Architecture firm: UAB “Jungtinės architektų dirbtuvės“
- Developer: Vilnius city municipality
- Main contractor: UAB “Constructus“

Website
- www.vilnius.lt

Vilnius City Municipality Building (Lithuanian: Vilniaus miesto savivaldybės pastatas) is located in Vilnius CBD on Konstitucijos Avenue, Vilnius. The building was completed and opened in 2004. In the past, Municipal Departments and Divisions were scattered throughout the capital. Now they are concentrated in the new center of the Municipality, which has improved the service of the city residents and the working conditions of the municipal employees.

== See also ==
- Town Hall, Vilnius
