= Žvejybos uostas =

Coordinates: 55°40′44″N 21°9′0″E

Žvejybos uostas (lit. Fishing Port) is a district in southern Klaipėda, the capital of Klaipėda County, Lithuania. It shares borders with Gandrališkės, Dubysa, Baltija, Poilsis to the east and Smeltė to the south.

The neighbourhood has one of the highest crime rates in Klaipėda.
