= Church of St. Raphael the Archangel, Vilnius =

Roman Catholic church in Lithuania

Church of St. Raphael the Archangel Šv. arkangelo Rapolo bažnyčia
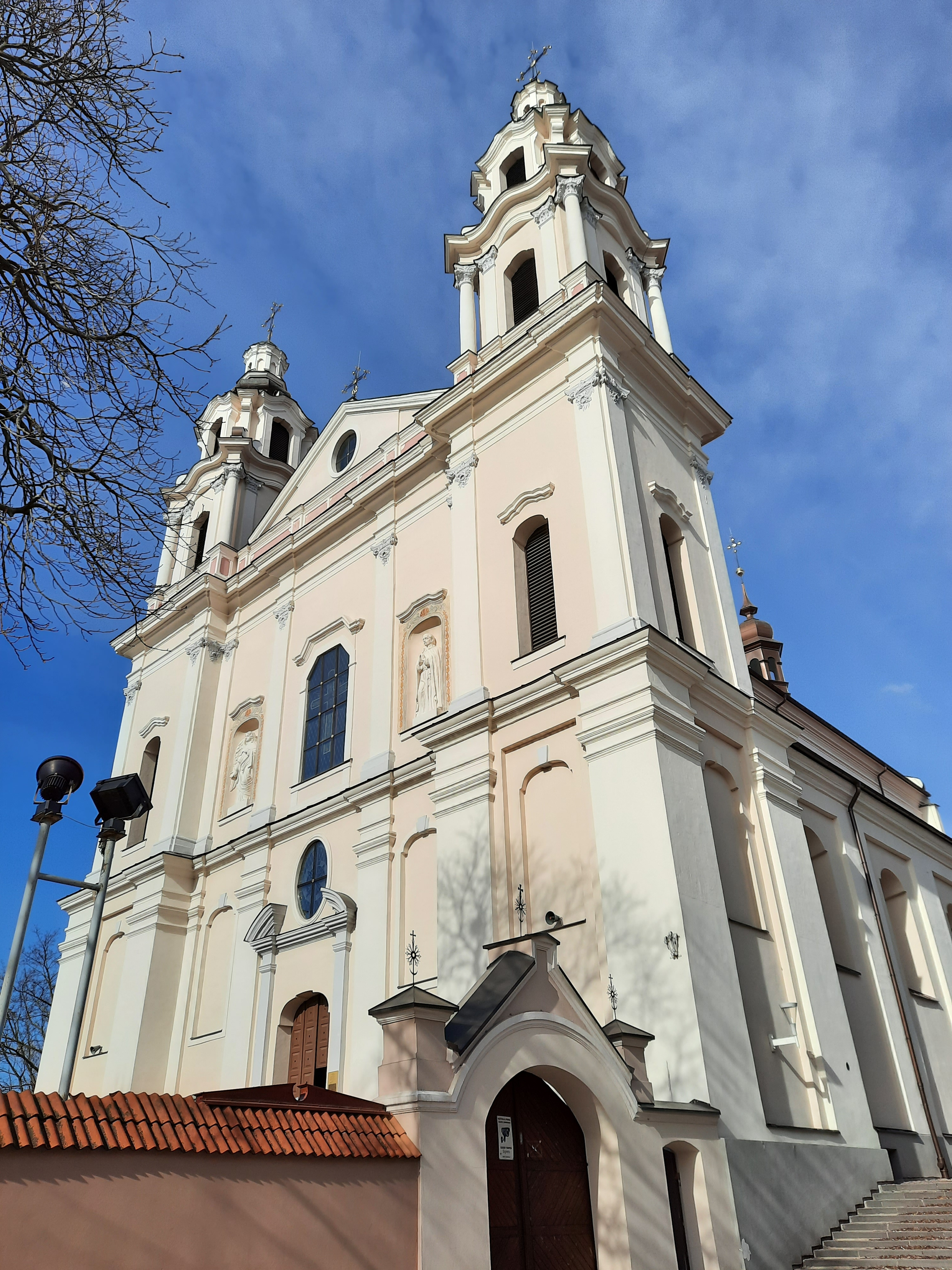
- Façade of the church in 2022

Religion
- Affiliation: Roman Catholic
- Diocese: Šnipiškės
- Ecclesiastical or organisational status: Used as a church
- Year consecrated: 1702

Location
- Location: Vilnius, Lithuania
- Interactive map of Church of St. Raphael the Archangel; Šv. arkangelo Rapolo bažnyčia
- Coordinates: 54°41′34″N 25°16′43.50″E

Architecture
- Architects: Hiacintas Ptakas, Jurgis Šikas (initial architects), Jonas Valentas Dyderšteinas (1752)
- Type: Church
- Style: Baroque
- Completed: 1709
- Materials: plastered masonry

Church of St. Raphael the Archangel (Lithuanian: Šv. arkangelo Rapolo bažnyčia, Polish: Kościół Św. Rafała Archanioła) is a Roman Catholic church in Šnipiškės, Vilnius. Former Jesuits monastery ensemble is located nearby which currently is used by the Department of Cultural Heritage of Lithuania.

Close to the church there was a wayside shrine, containing a statue of Christ Carrying the Cross. The shrine was built around 1710 during the Great Northern War plague outbreak in Vilnius.

On 14 August 1904, the first President of the independent Lithuania Antanas Smetona married Sofija Smetonienė in the Church of St. Raphael.

A wooden sculpture of Jesus from the demolished Chapel of Jesus of Šnipiškės, which was built in ~1720, was discovered in the basements of the church in 2017 and following a restoration is currently exhibited in the Church Heritage Museum in Vilnius.

== Gallery ==
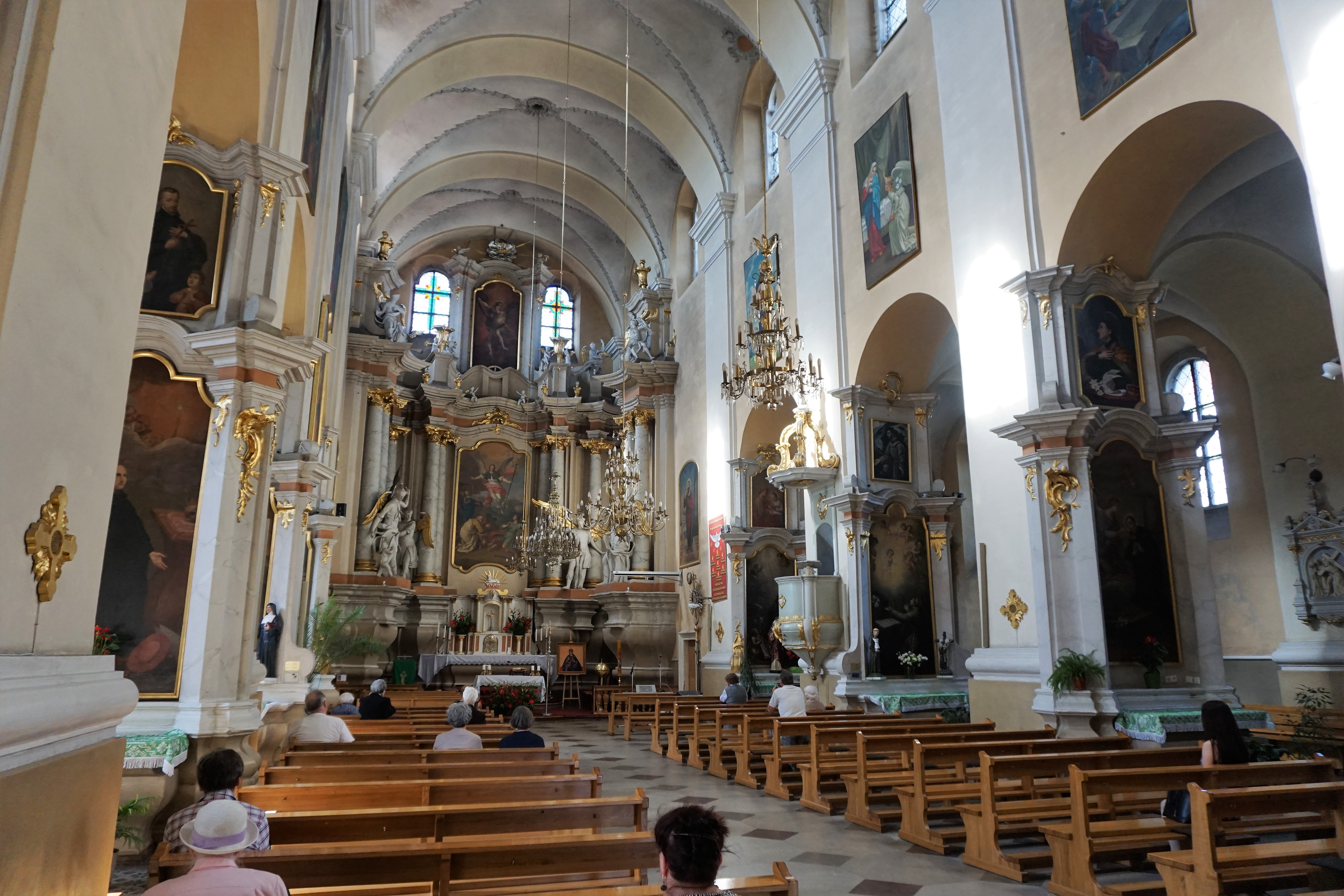
Interior of the church and its central altar with painting of St. Raphael

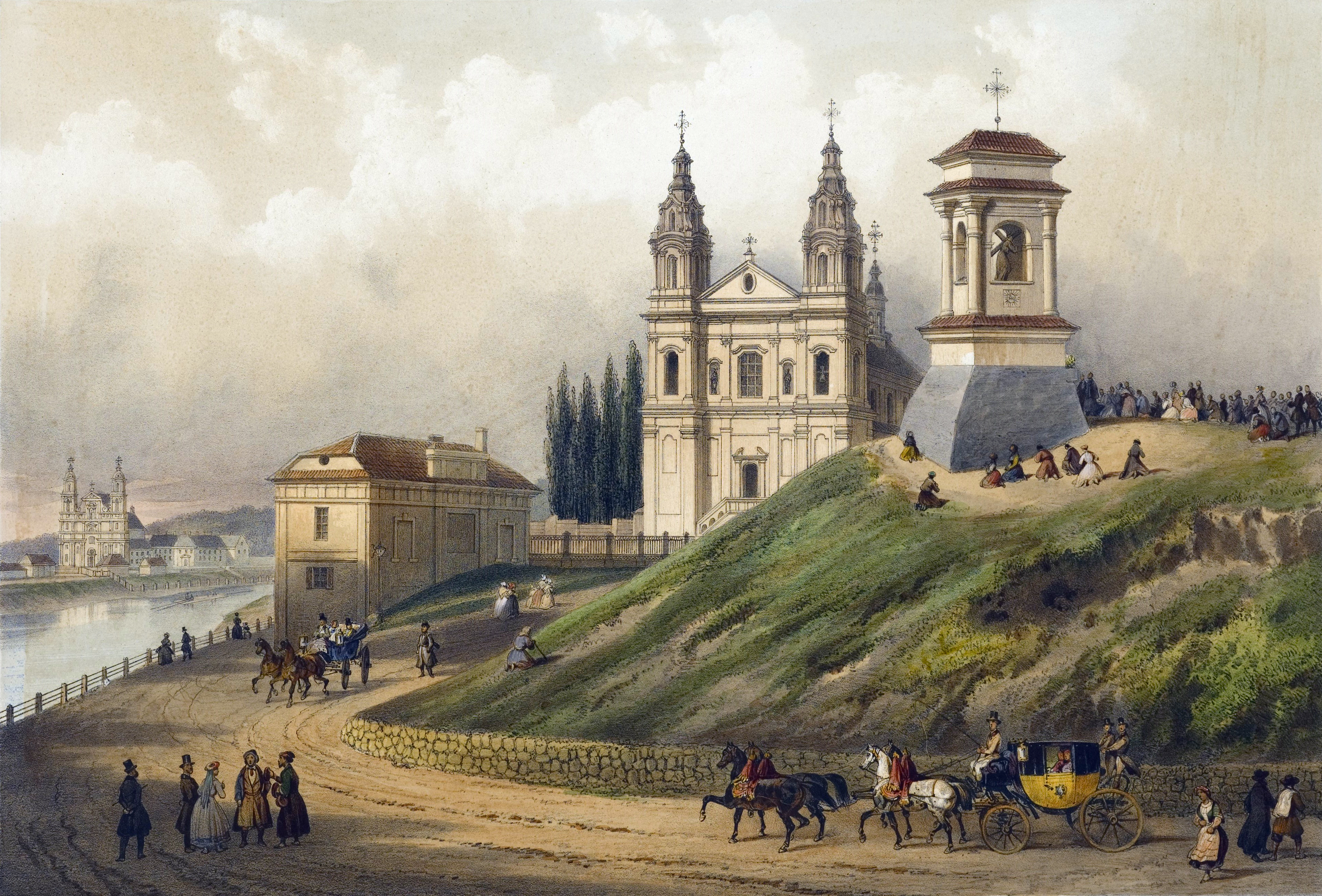
Church and the wayside shrine, containing a statue of Christ Carrying the Cross in 19th century

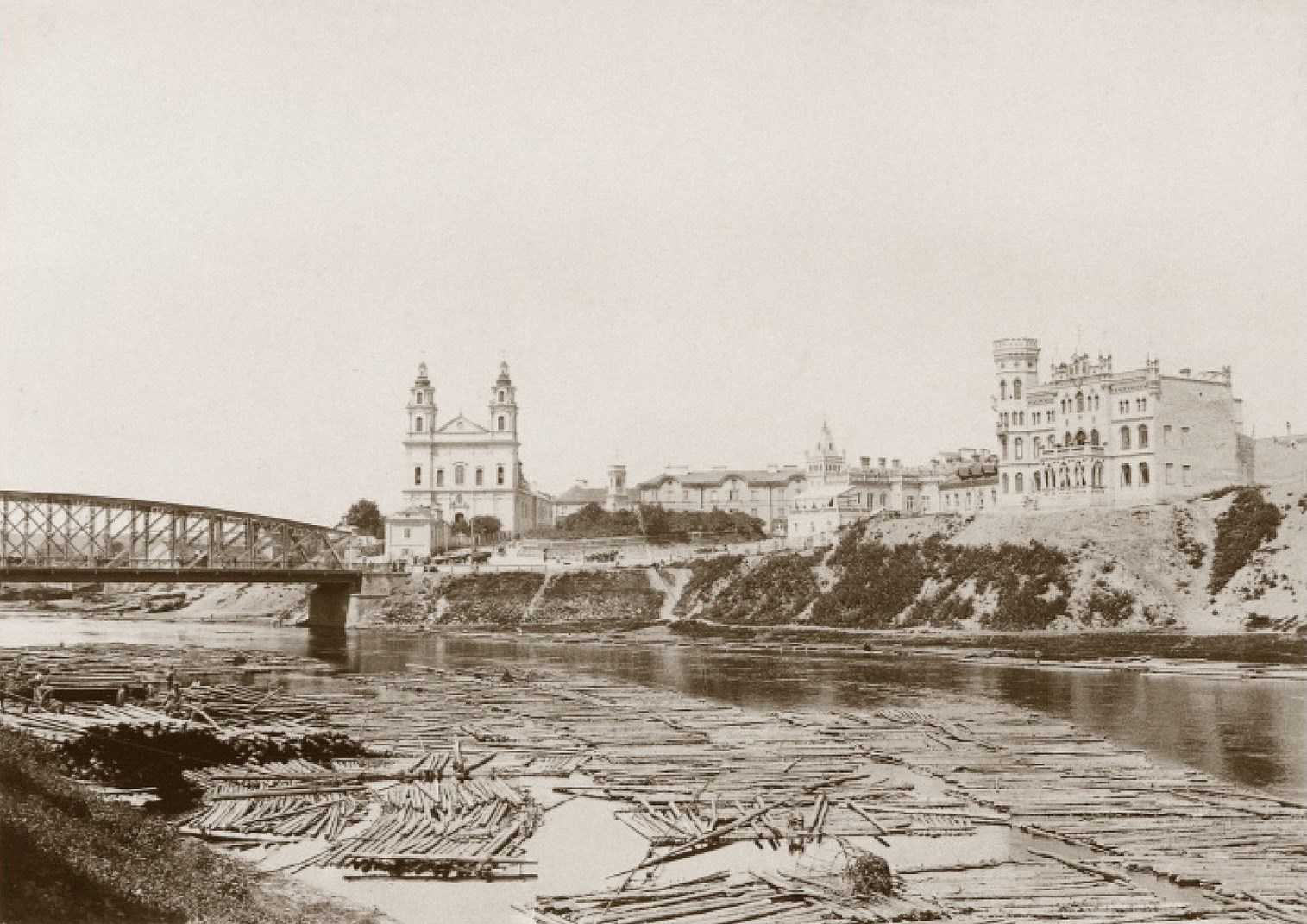
Church and its surroundings in 1898

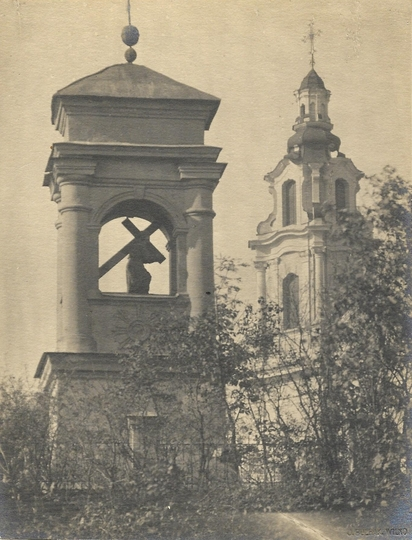
Chapel of Jesus of Šnipiškės near the church, photographed before World War II

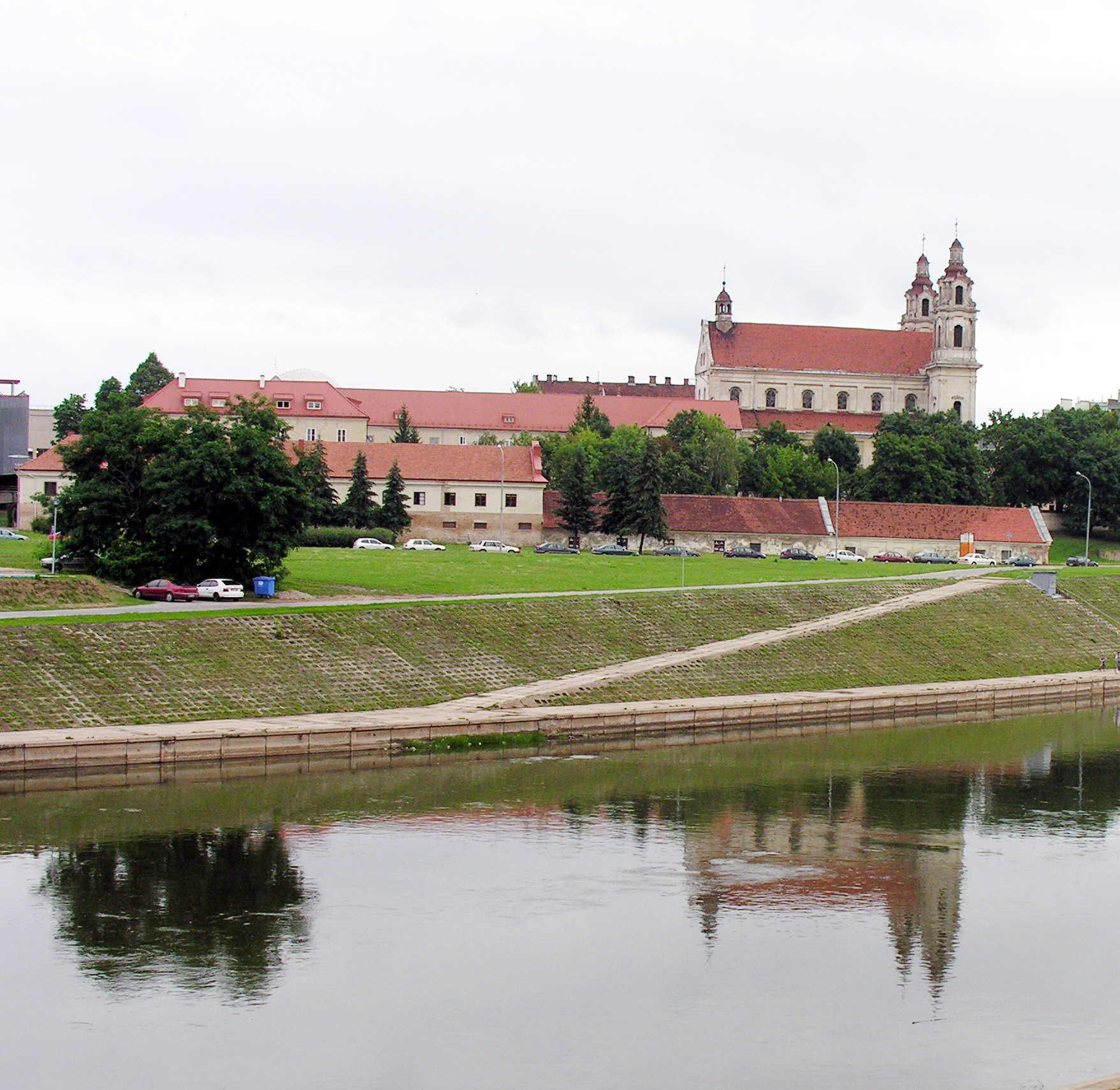
Façade of the church and the Jesuits monastery ensemble

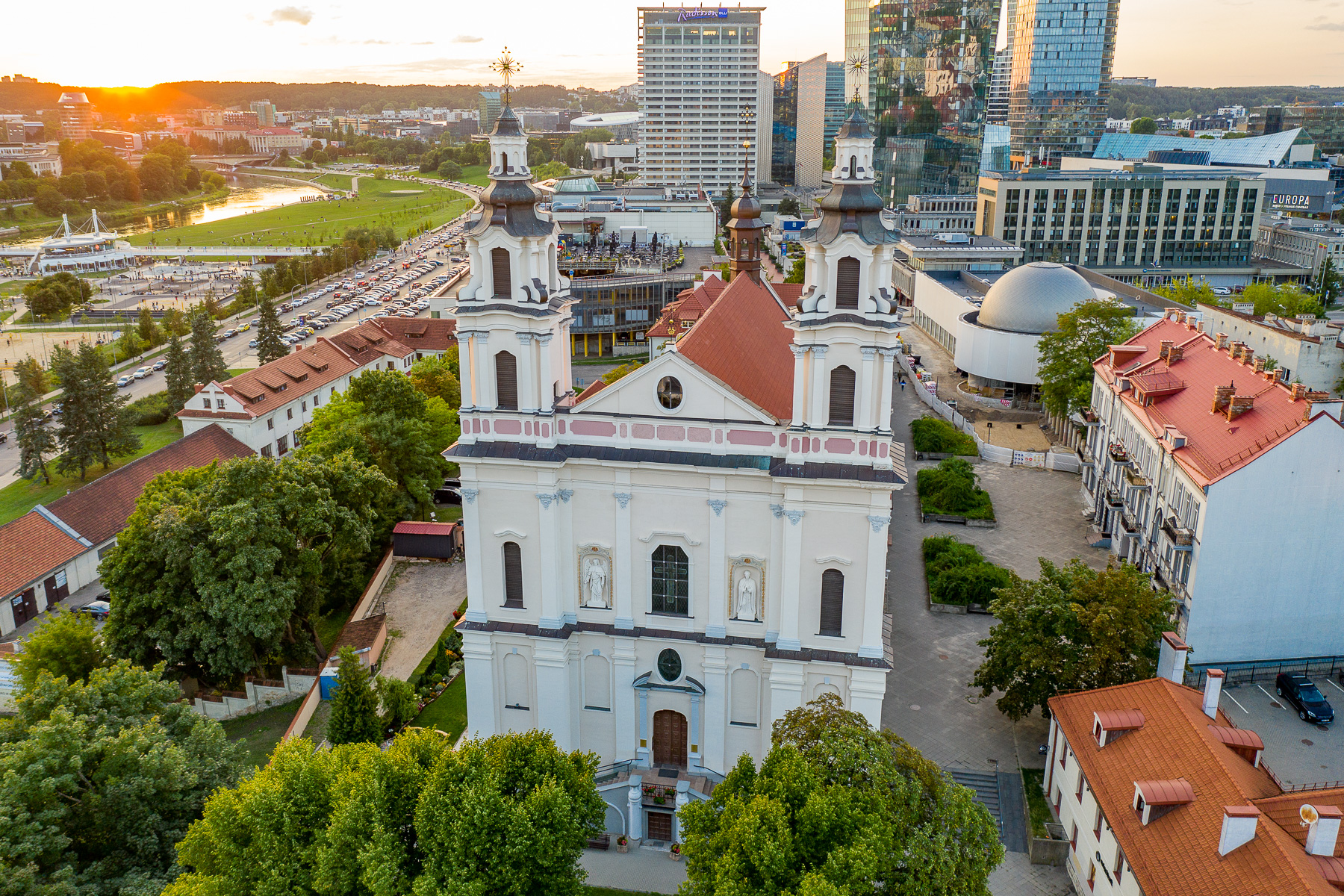
Aerial view in 2023

== See also ==
- List of Jesuit sites
