= Europa Tower =

- Europos bokštas
- Interactive map of the Europa Tower area

General information
- Type: Office
- Location: Vilnius, Lithuania, Konstitucijos Avenue 7
- Coordinates: 54.696°N 25.278°E
- Completed: May 1, 2004

Height
- Architectural: 148 m (486 ft)
- Tip: 153 m (502 ft)

Technical details
- Floor count: 33

Design and construction
- Architect: Audrius Ambrasas

The Europa Tower (Lithuanian: Europos bokštas) is a skyscraper located in Vilnius CBD, Lithuania. It is the tallest building in the Baltic states. It is located on Konstitucijos Avenue in Šnipiškės, a district of Lithuania's capital Vilnius. It rises 153 meters above the ground. It was designed by the Vilnius-based Audrius Ambrasas Architects Company. Dominating the skyline of the newly developing New City Center, the building was completed and officially opened on 1 May 2004, as part of Lithuania's celebrations upon entering the European Union. The building caused some controversy among some of the public and some watchdog groups because of its interference with the historic skyline of the Vilnius' Old Town. Despite varying opinions, the tower is now often regarded as a modern landmark of the Lithuanian capital. There is an observation deck on the open roof terrace at 114 m (374 ft).

== Project history ==
The first announcements concerning the building appeared on the Internet in 2002, when some computer-generated renderings were published on an architectural website. The initial design had thirty floors which were later updated, when three additional floors were added. This change in the original plan by the architect and developer, caused a confrontation with various heritage protection agencies. However, the project was approved by the municipality of Vilnius and was implemented according to the new plan. Construction started in late 2002, and was fully completed by April 2004. The tower is part of the Europa Square Complex, located in the New City Center, and is on the right bank of River Neris.

On September 1, 2006, Alain Robert, also known as the human Spider-Man, climbed the Europa Tower along the eastern side facing Europa Square (left of a light stripe seen in the photograph above).

== Gallery ==
Europa complex from the Swedbank terrace

During a rainy day

Europa Tower behind municipality building

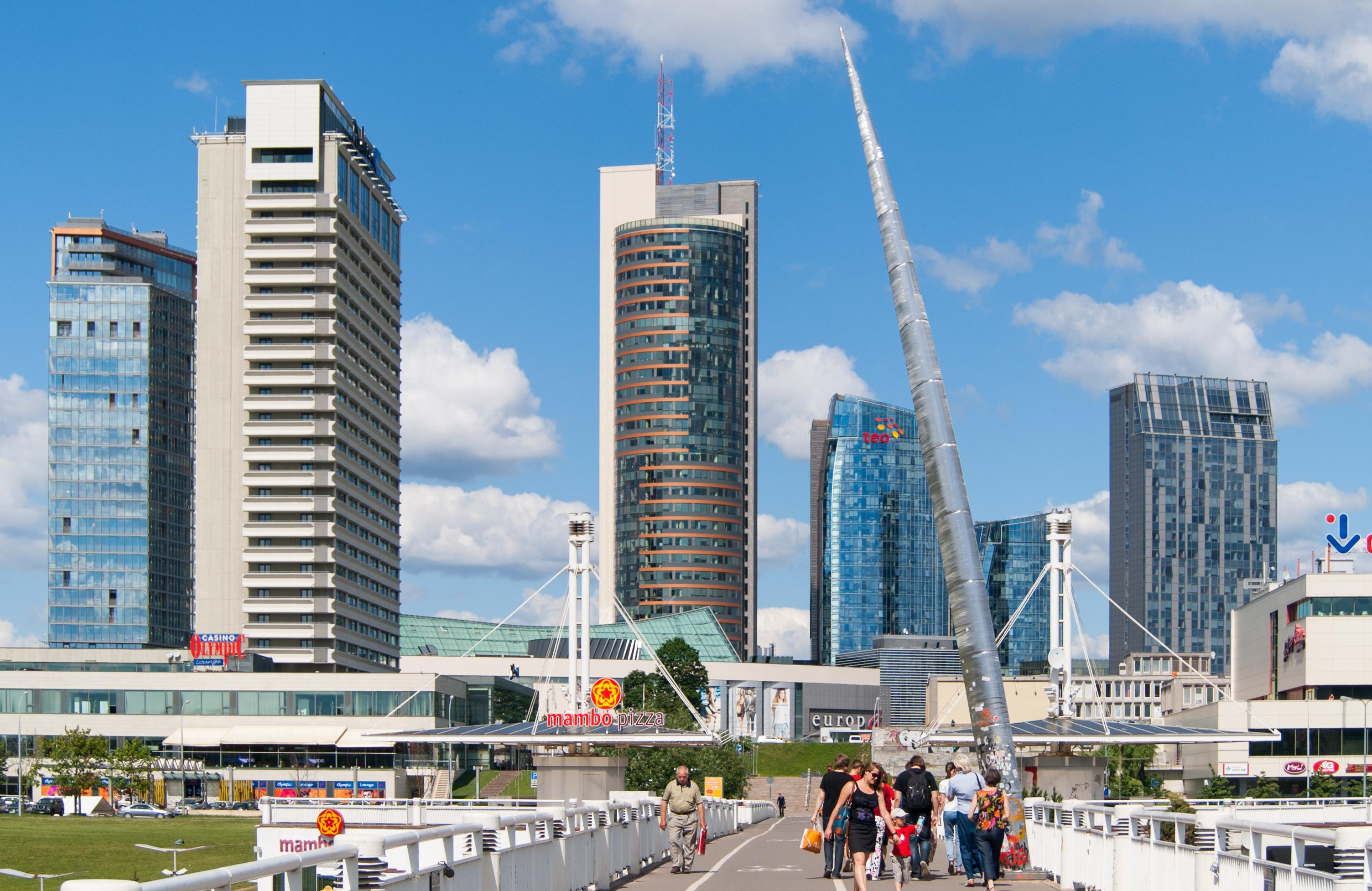
Vilnius CBD

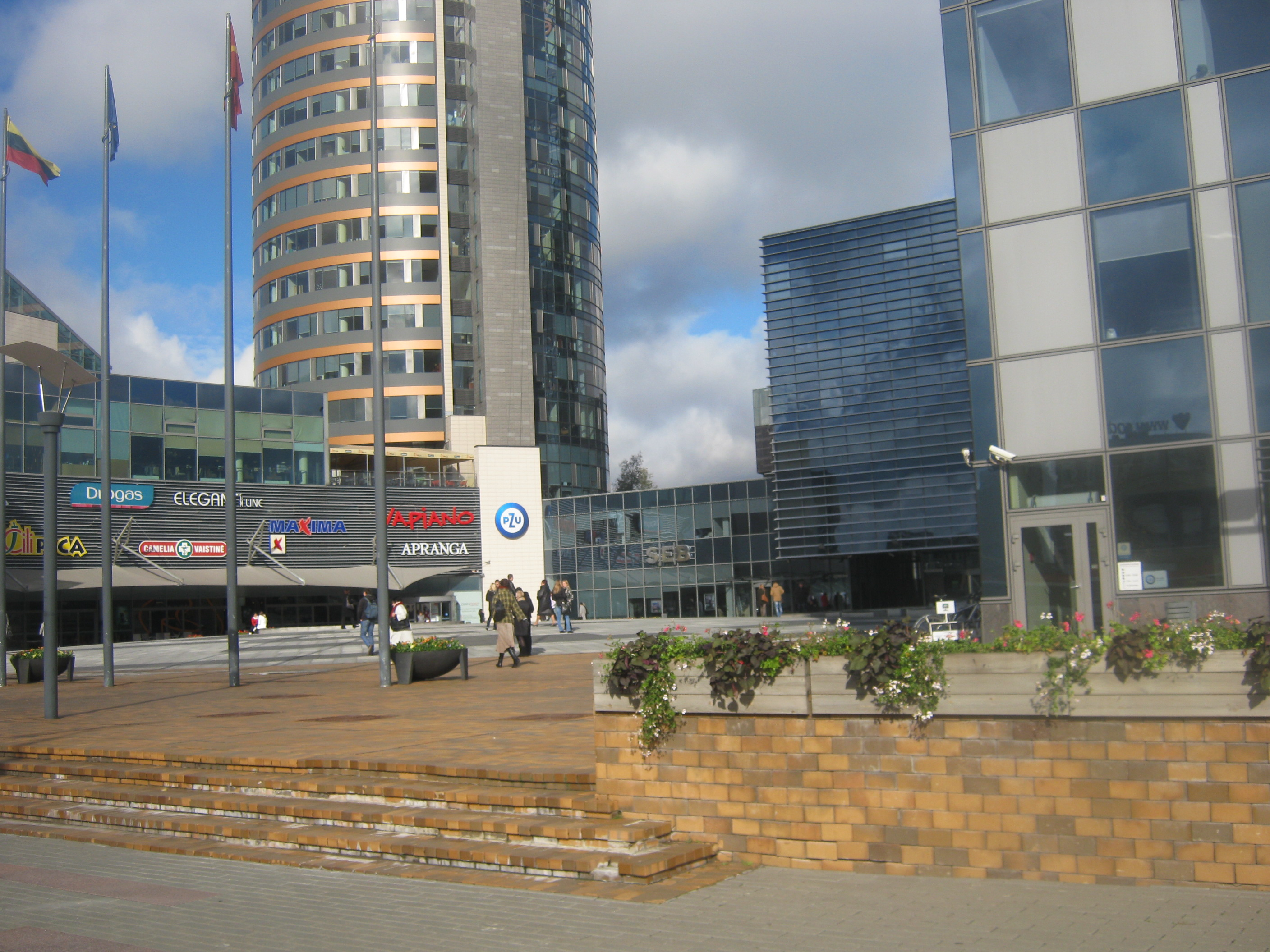
Main entrance

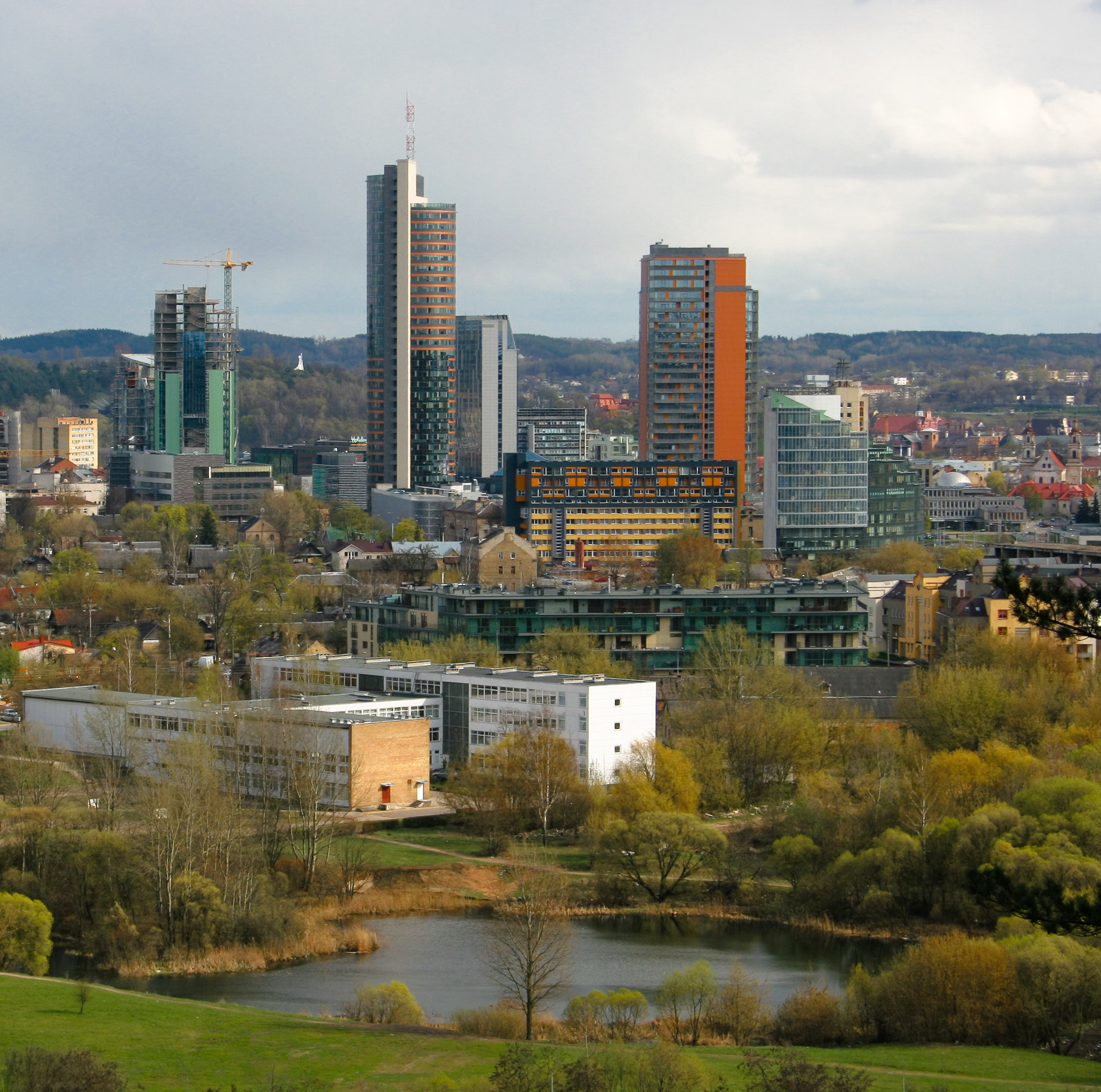
Vilnius downtown with Europa Tower in the middle

== See also ==
- Vilnius Central Business District
- List of tallest buildings in Lithuania
- List of tallest buildings in the Baltic states
