= Vilnius Central Business District =

Central business district of Vilnius, Lithuania

Coordinates: 54°41′45″N 25°16′32″E

Vilnius Central Business District Naujasis Miesto Centras
- Central Business District seen from the Baltasis tiltas (White Bridge) Konstitucijos Avenue, the main street in the Central Business District Central Business District at sunrise In mid-2024

- Location within Lithuania
- Country: Lithuania
- Region: Vilnius County
- Elderships: Šnipiškės

Area
  - Total: 0.62 km^{2} (0.24 sq mi)

Population
  - Total: 2,500
  - Density: 4,000/km^{2} (10,000/sq mi)
- Time zone: UTC+2 (EET)
  - Summer (DST): UTC+3 (EEST)
- Postal code: 92
- Website: vilniuscbd.lt

2024 CEV Beach Volley Nations Cup tournament was held in Vilnius CBD

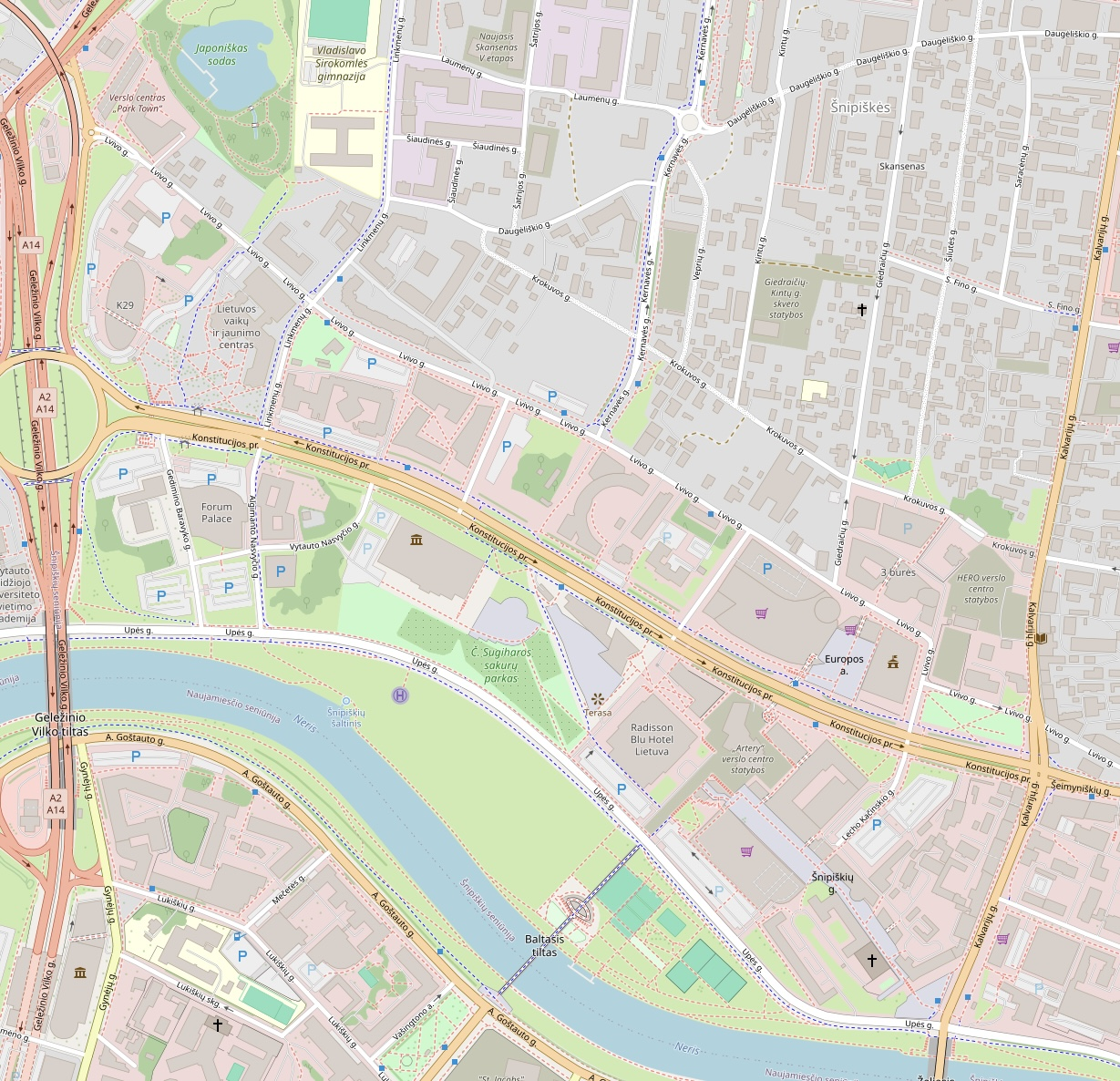
Vilnius Central Business District is located in the southern part of Šnipiškės Eldership

The Vilnius Central Business District, commonly called Vilnius CBD or Vilnius NMC, is a rapidly developing business district in Šnipiškės eldership of Vilnius, Lithuania. It is Lithuania's most important business district and the largest of its kind in the Baltic States.

Between 2000 and 2018, more than 480,000 square metres (5,200,000 sq ft) of floor area was added to Vilnius CBD. Most of the growth occurred after 2010, with intense growth continuing after 2020. Since 2022, Vilnius has been experiencing a large influx of foreign professionals, many of whom work in the CBD.

This area is called Naujasis miesto centras and abbreviated Vilniaus NMC in Lithuanian. The Baltasis tiltas (White Bridge) connects the area with the Naujamiestis eldership. Vilnius government has created a virtual 3D map of the area where present and future buildings can be seen.

== Buildings and organizations ==
Many of Lithuania's high-rise office buildings are located here, including Europa Tower, the tallest office building in the Baltic states. As of December 2023, Vilnius CBD has about a dozen high rises designed by local and foreign architecture firms including Daniel Libeskind, Lund + Slaatto Arkitekter, Audrius Ambrasas, RSHP and others.

Large multinational corporations have their local or regional headquarters here, for example Nasdaq, Revolut, Swedbank, SEB Group, Luminor Bank, Unity Technologies, Huawei, Yara International, and Johnson & Johnson. The area is especially popular with banks and financial institutions. As of late 2022, Vilnius CBD is sparsely inhabited and is mostly filled with offices and commercial spaces. In 2022, office rental prices were ranging from 16,5 to 20 euros per square meter (appx 10.8 square feet).

Two large shopping centers are located in Vilnius CBD – VCUP and Europa.

== Sports fields ==
There is a White Bridge sports field next to the bridge, which hosts 9 beach volleyball courts, 3 double-sided basketball courts, a park for roller skaters and skateboarders, outdoor training grounds and children playgrounds. Various sports competitions are organised here.

Concerts, festivals and other entertainment activities are regularly hosted in a field near Vilnius CBD and the White Bridge. Annual laser show, part of "Sostinės Dienos" (English: "Capital City Days") is held here.

== Future buildings ==
As of late 2023, multiple high-rise buildings planned in the area, many of which have been approved by the city government. Upcoming notable buildings include:

Future buildings, as of December 2023
Name	Floor area	Short description	References
Burė 4	18,000 square metres (190,000 sq ft)	17 floor building by Swedish real estate investor Eastnine	
Hero by Realco	32,000 square metres (340,000 sq ft)	14 floor building by Realco	
Konstitucijos pr. 14A	19,200 square metres (207,000 sq ft)	7 floor building designed by Rogers Stirk Harbour + Partners	
Horizontai	55,000 square metres (590,000 sq ft)	Multiple high-rise buildings, the most expensive Vilnius CBD project to date.	
Lvivo 38	unknown	29 floor high-rise building.	
Lvivo 68A	25,500 square metres (274,000 sq ft)	Office complex consisting of multiple buildings	
Krokuvos 24	10,000 square metres (110,000 sq ft)	Slender 100+ meter high-rise building.	

== See also ==
- List of central business districts
- List of tallest buildings in Lithuania
- List of tallest buildings in the Baltic states

== Gallery ==
"Europa" mall

Europa Square

Façades of high rises in Europa Square

Business center "3 Burės"

"3 burės" front facade

State enterprise "Registrų centras"

View form Kalvarijų Str.

Konstitucijos Avenue

Radisson Blu Hotel Lietuva and offices from the south east side

View from Šnipiškės

Swedbank Headquarters

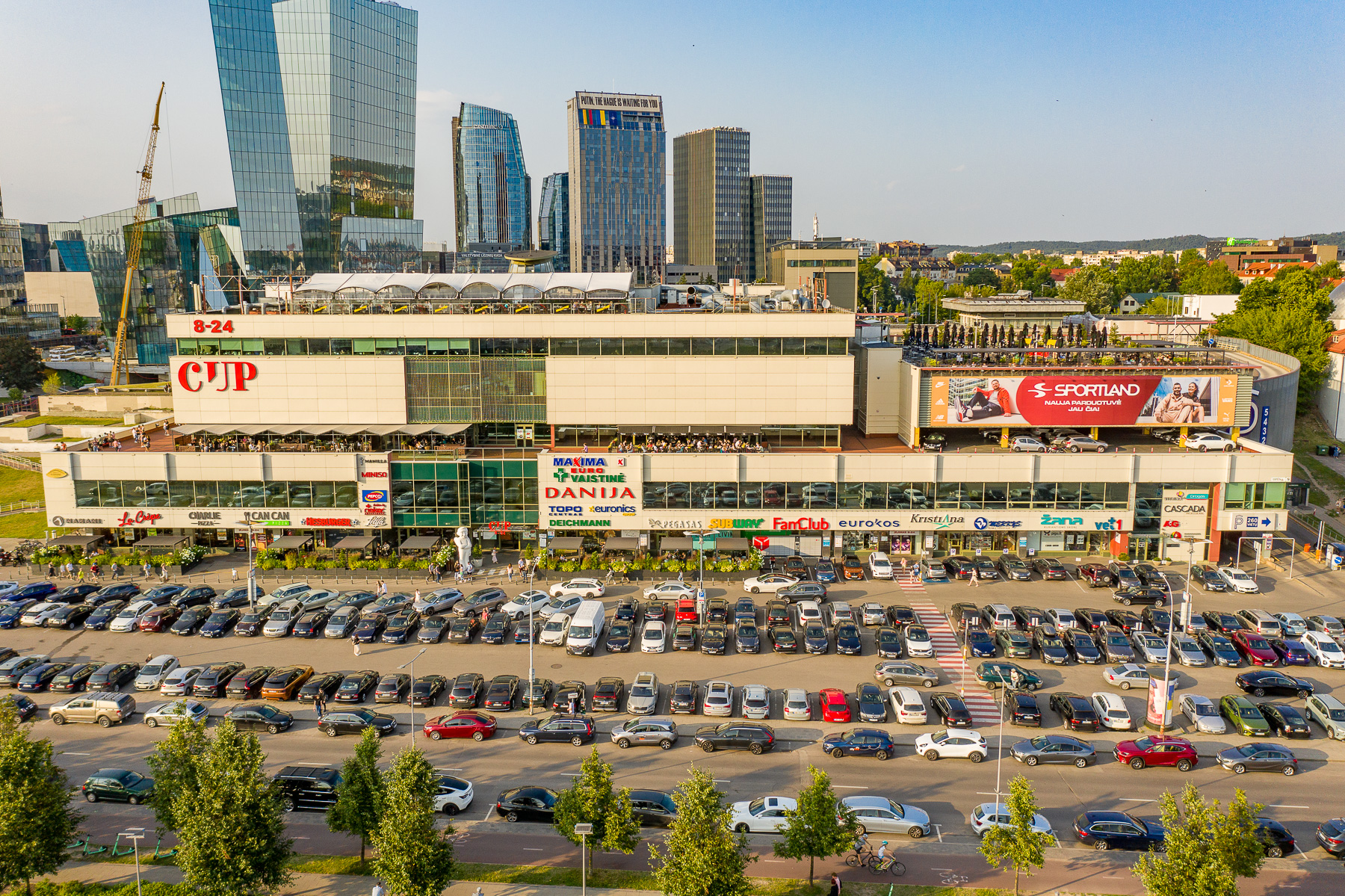
"CUP Vilnius" shopping mall

Skyline (2021)

Lithuanian Health Insurance Fund

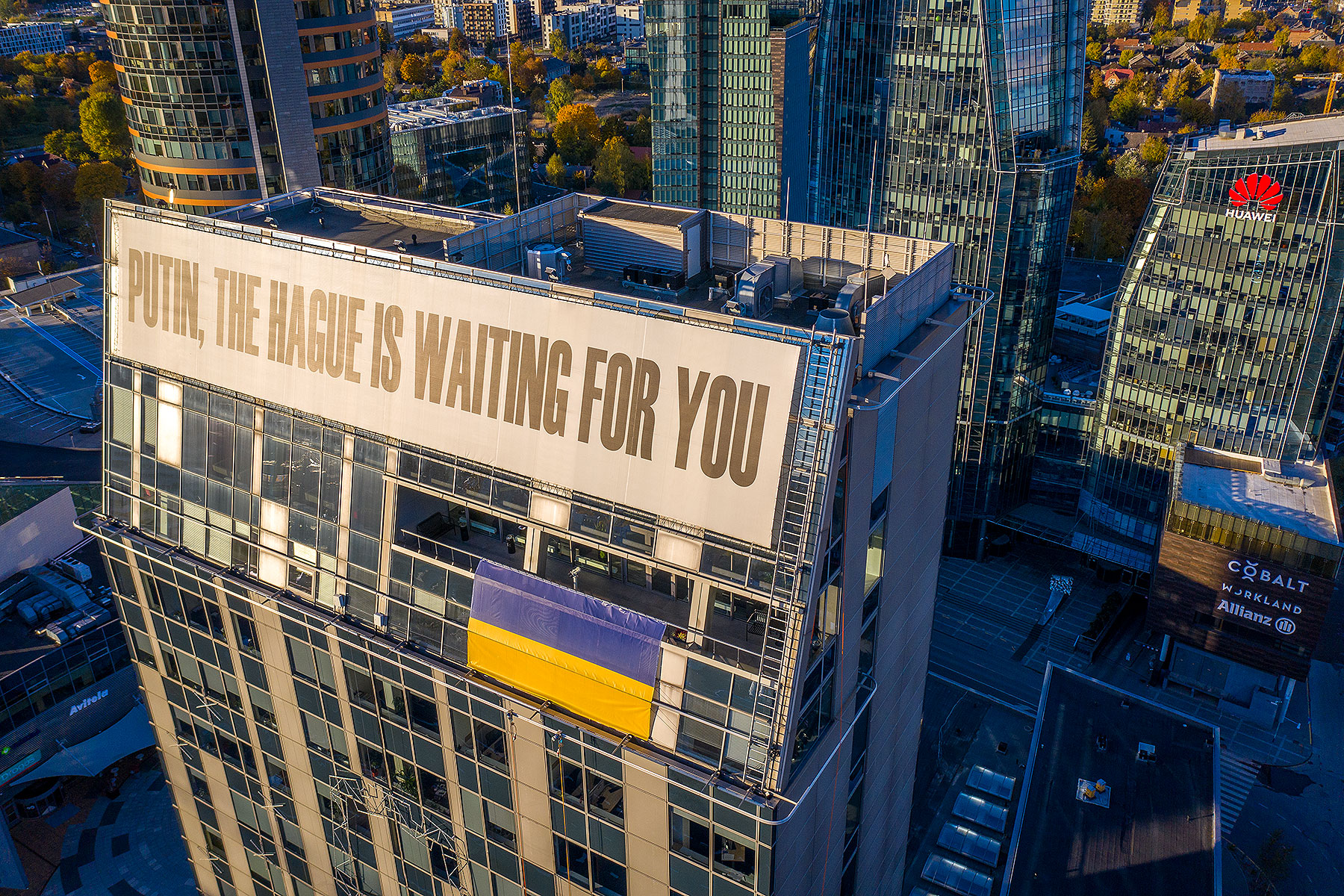
Top of Vilnius City Municipality Building

Buildings in Vilniaus verslo uostas (Vilnius Business Harbour)

Old wooden and modern high rises architecture

#Tower Apartment Block, the second tallest building in Vilnius, under construction in 2017
