= Šnipiškės =

- Eldership
- Aerial view of the Constitution Avenue

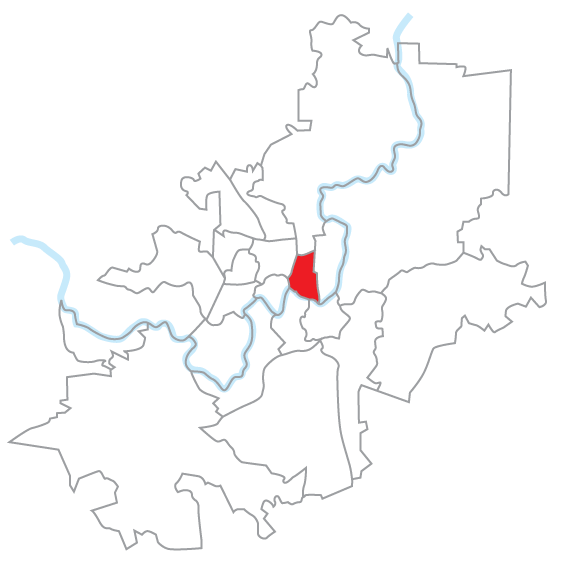

- Location within Lithuania
- Country: Lithuania
- County: Vilnius County
- Municipality: Vilnius city municipality

Area
  - Total: 3.1 km^{2} (1.2 sq mi)

Population (2021)
  - Total: 17,270
  - Density: 5,600/km^{2} (14,000/sq mi)
- Time zone: UTC+2 (EET)
  - Summer (DST): UTC+3 (EEST)

Šnipiškės is a neighborhood in Vilnius, the capital of Lithuania. Vilnius Central Business District is a part of Šnipiškės. Located on the north bank of the river Neris, it became the site of a modern business district with skyscrapers which, however, mix with some historical wooden architecture.

Until recently, the area was a small historical suburban village north of the Vilnius Old Town. Several skyscrapers, including Europa Tower business center, have been erected since the turn of the millennium. It continues to rapidly expand with major projects for modern commercial and apartment complexes as well as recreational areas. An area with late 19th- and early 20th-century wooden houses, popularly referred to as the Shanghai district, is now under cultural protection and preservation.

Šnipiškės is also home to the Kalvarijos Market.

== Etymology ==
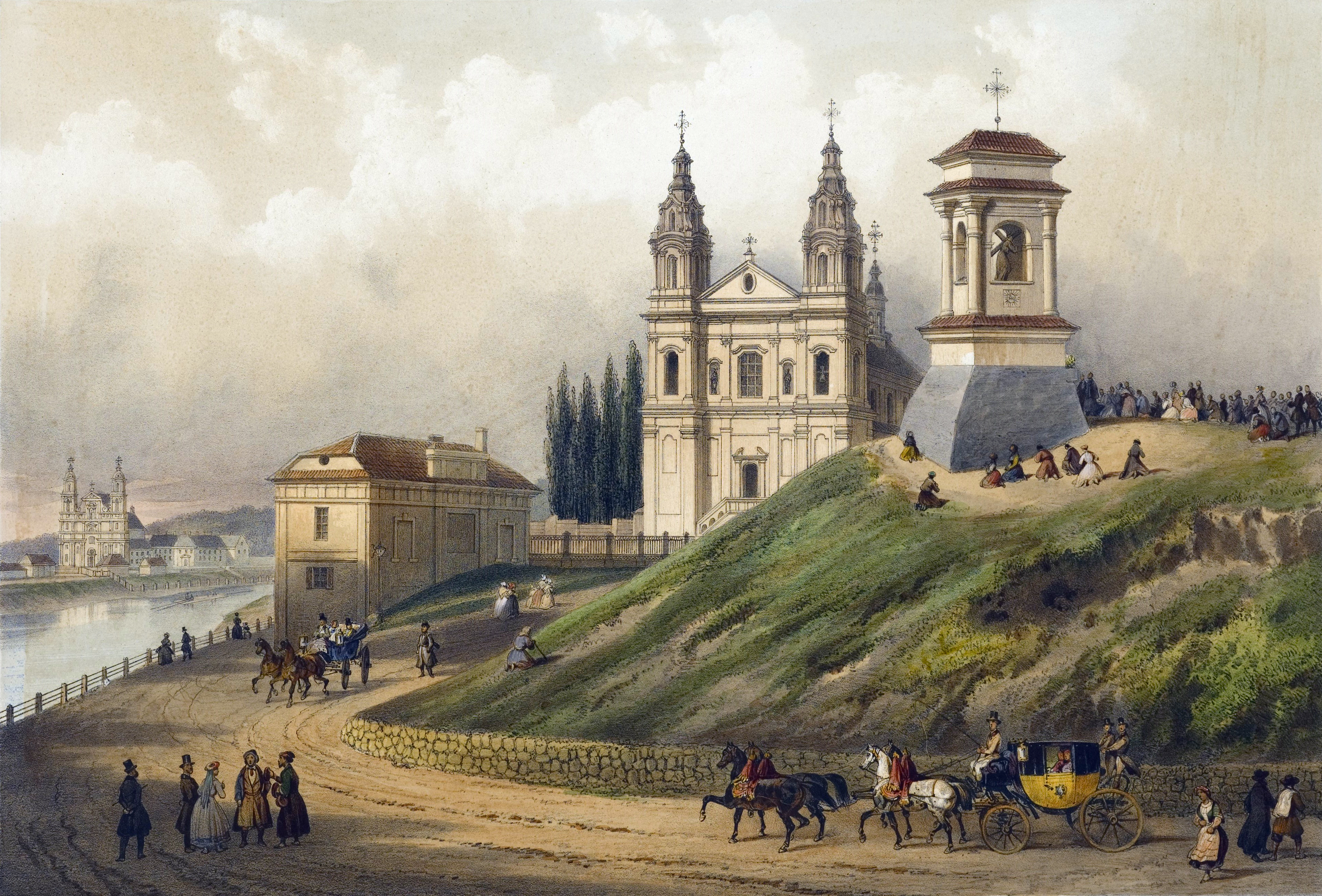
Šnipiškės in the 19th century with the Chapel of Jesus of Šnipiškės

Šnipiškės was named after a rich merchant Povilas Šnipka (Šnipis), who lived in the 16th century, and owned the land plots in the area. During the Interwar period various tourist guides in Vilnius used the Šnipiškis spelling.

Its alternative names in other languages include: Polish: Snipiszki; Yiddish: שניפּישאָק, romanized: Shnipishok.

== History ==
Šnipiškės was first mentioned in the historic documents of Vilnius in the 16th century. In 1536, in order to improve connection with the Vilnius city (the Old Town), Sigismund I the Old, the Grand Duke of Lithuania, ordered Ulrich Hosius to build a bridge over Neris, today known as the Green Bridge. It was a wooden bridge with masonry pillars and gates as well as rooms for the bridge guards and customs officers. Šnipiškės developed near the bridge as a suburb of Vilnius.

In the second half of the 17th century, Šnipiškės were governed by the Astikai family and later by Eustachy Wołłowicz. Over the time, various plots of land in this area were owned by Walerian Protasewicz, the bishop of Vilnius, and the Oginskiai family. In the 17th century, Šnipiškės were mostly owned by the Sapiega family and in 1697 a land plot near Neris was donated to the Jesuit Order by Jan Kazimierz Sapieha.

== Art ==
In 2013-2015, a Mosaic Route was developed in the historic part of Šnipiškės, addressing the area's connection with the ceramic workshops, for which the district was well-known in XVII-XVIII centuries. A mosaic route was created by local children and joining adults during Street Mosaic Workshops, initiated by the Laboratory of Urban Games and Research "Laimikis.lt" as part of the historic area's research and cultural revitalisation program. The route embraced Fino, Krokuvos, Kintų streets and a territory between Fino and Kintų. After the renovation of the area in 2021 only some parts of the Mosaic Route remained.

In 2017 historic Šnipiškės neighbourhood was presented at the Bi-City Biennale of Urbanism/Architecture in Shenzhen, China. The location of the collective exhibition "Cities, Grow in Difference", dedicated to the phenomenon of the urban village was Nantou (historic town). The exhibition on Šnipiškės "Urban Patchwork - Wood, Concrete, Glass" was curated by Jekaterina Lavrinec and Julius Narkūnas as representatives of the Laboratory of Urban Games and Research. It consisted of collages of objects and materials found at the site where Šnipiškės wooden houses were demolished, a series of photographs exploring the unique urban contrast, photo collages, and interactive object "The House" that invited the audience to layer textures. The exhibition is included in the catalogue of the Biennale and is mentioned in the publication in the "World Architecture" issue, dedicated to Lithuanian Architecture (2018-06).

== Gallery ==
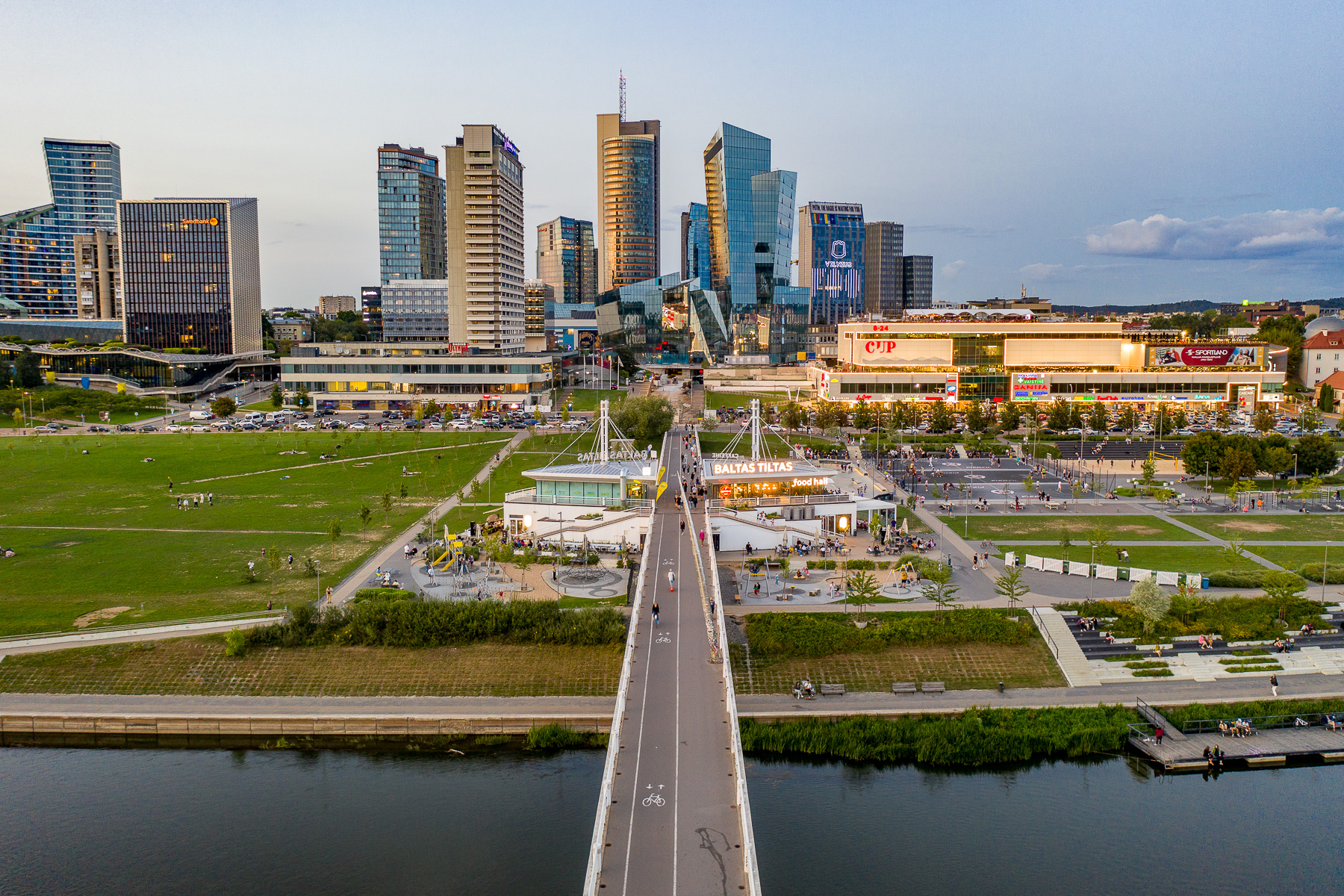
Vilnius central business district

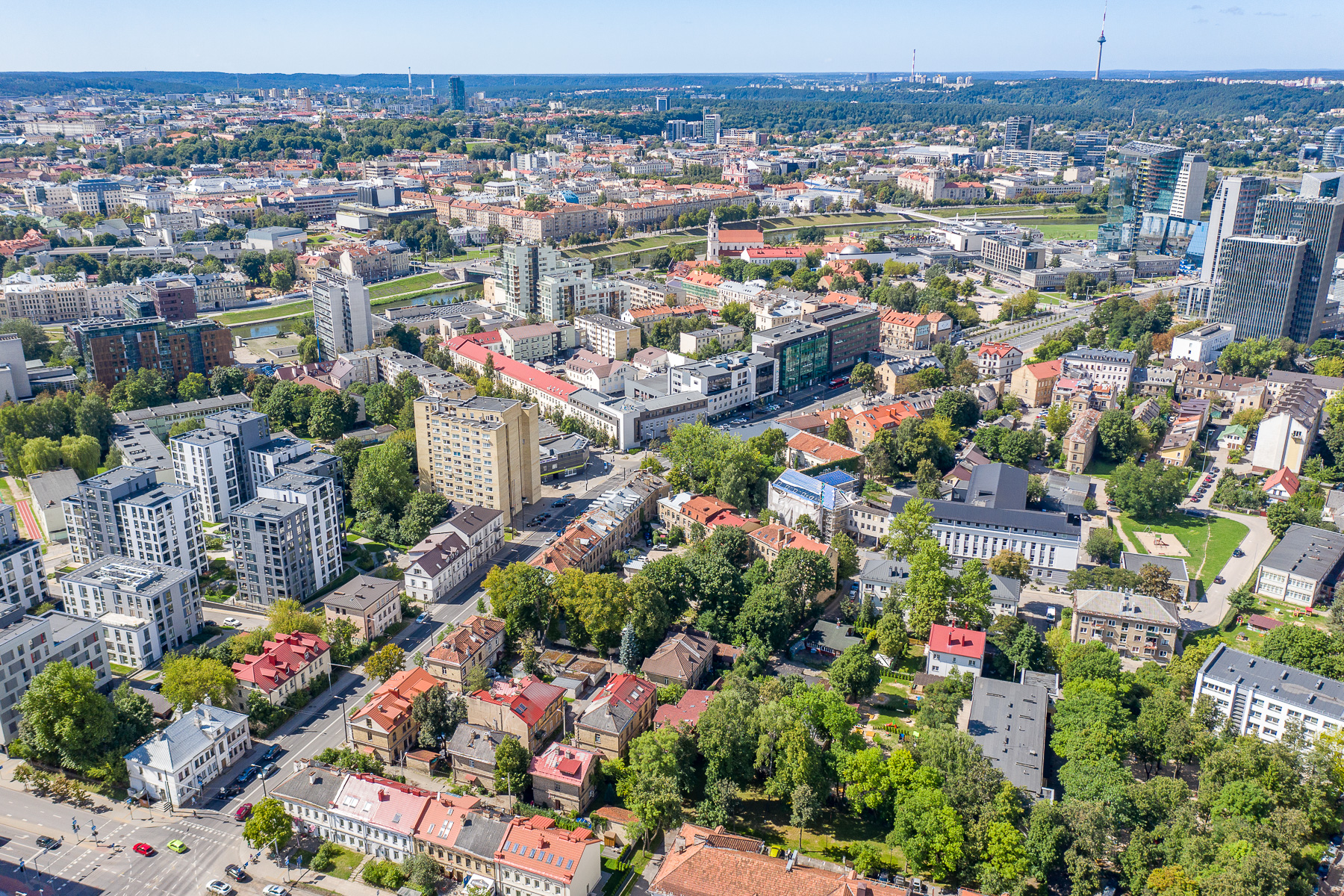
Aerial view of Šnipiškės in summer 2023

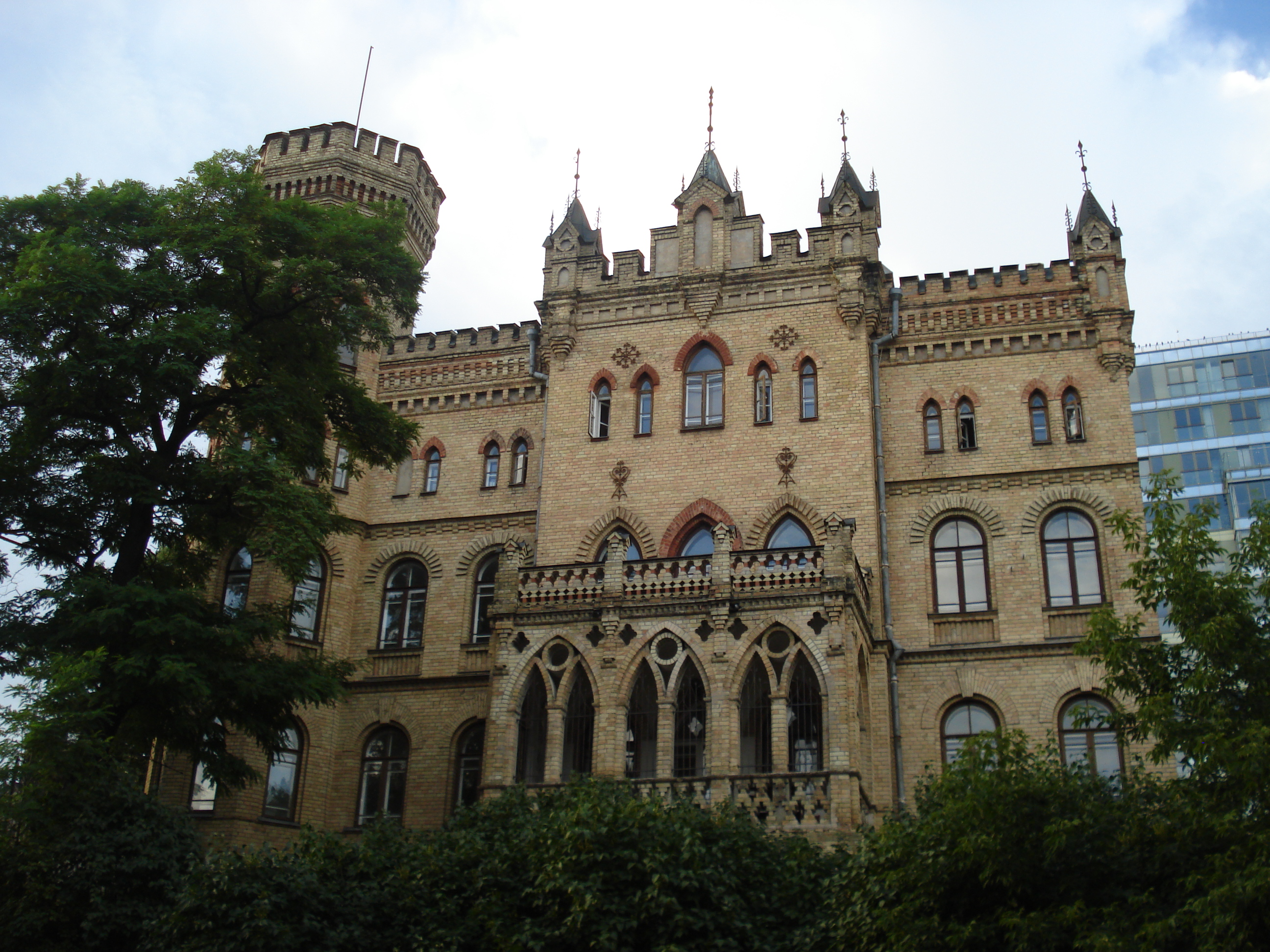
Raduškevičius Palace

Europa Tower

Aerial view

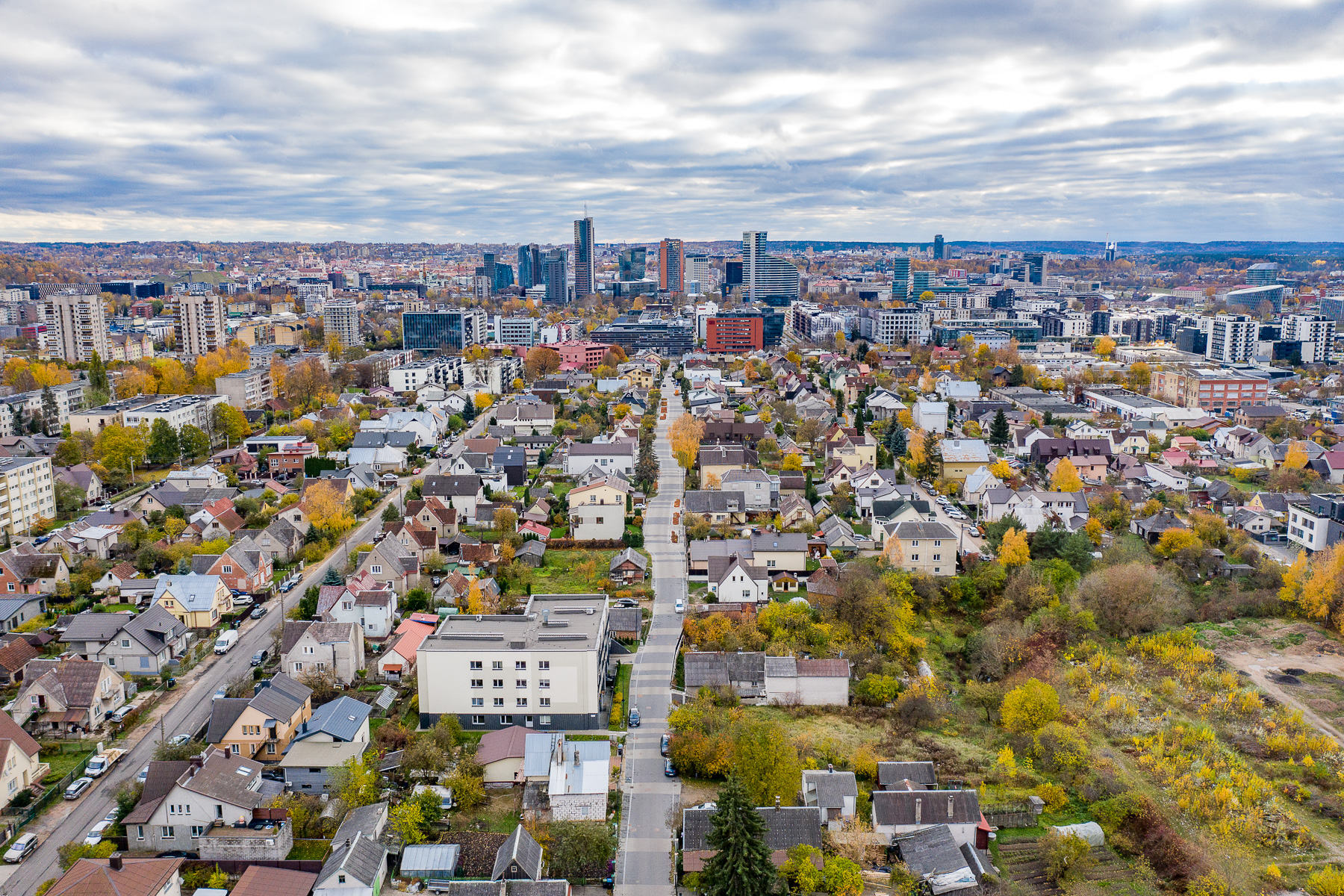
Širvintos street in 2023

== See also ==
- Church of St. Raphael the Archangel, Vilnius
