= List of tallest buildings in Lithuania =

This is a list of tallest buildings in Lithuania. The rankings are based on the building's structural height (vertical elevation from the base to the highest architectural or integral structural element of the building). For this reason, buildings with spires are measured to the top of the spire, however, antennas on top of buildings are not counted to their overall height. Towers, such as the Vilnius TV Tower are not considered buildings as they are not continuously habitable, and will not be found on this list. Many of the buildings listed here can be found in Vilnius Central Business District.

== List of completed buildings of over 60 meters ==
Was the tallest building in Lithuania upon completion

Rank	Building	Image	City	Height	Floors	Built
1	Europa Tower		Vilnius	148 m	33	2004
2	Pilsotas		Klaipėda	112 m	34	2007
3	TOWER Apartments		Vilnius	104 m	29	2018
4	Helios City Tower A		Vilnius	96 m	27	2006
5	Europa Square Apartments		Vilnius	95 m	27	2004
6	The Big Sail (Vilnius Business Harbour Tower A)		Vilnius	86 m	24	2008
7	Radisson Blu Hotel Lietuva		Vilnius	85 m	23	1983
8	Artery (1st from the right)		Vilnius	84 m	20	2024
10	BIG2 2	The BIG2 building complex can be seen in the distance to the right.	Klaipėda	82 m	25	2009
11=	Grand Office		Vilnius	81 m	21	2014
11=	The Third Sail (Swedbank)		Vilnius	81 m	23	2018
12	Spaudos Rūmai		Vilnius	80 m	18	1985
13	Church of St. Matthew		Anykščiai	79 m	-	1909
14=	Municipality Building		Vilnius	77 m	20	2004
14=	Vilnius Gate Apartments	Visible on the right.	Vilnius	77 m	18	2007
15=	Victoria Tower	Victoria Tower can be seen in the foreground, the tallest among the row of office buildings.	Vilnius	76 m	16	2005
15=	Church of Assumption of Mary		Palanga	76 m	-	1908
17=	Viršuliškių Porelė I		Vilnius	74 m	24	2006
17=	Viršuliškių Porelė II		Vilnius	74 m	24	2006
19=	BIG2 1	The BIG2 building complex can be seen in the distance to the right.	Klaipėda	73 m	22	2009
19=	BIG2 3	The BIG2 building complex can be seen in the distance to the right.	Klaipėda	73 m	22	2009
19=	Flow		Vilnius	73 m	20	2023
22=	D Tower		Klaipėda	72 m	21	2006
22=	K Tower		Klaipėda	72 m	21	2006
22=	Church of Our Lady of Sorrows		Salakas	72 m	-	1911
25=	Church of the Annunciation to the Blessed Virgin Mary		Kretinga	70 m		1617
25=	Church of the Resurrection of Christ		Kaunas	70 m	-	2005
25=	Skylum 1		Vilnius	70 m	20	2024
25=	Skylum 2		Vilnius	70 m	20	2024
29	Sky Office		Vilnius	69.55 m	18	2023
30=	Žirgo Apartments		Vilnius	68 m	20	2004
30=	Church of St. John		Vilnius	68 m	-	1748
32	Quadrum Business City East Tower		Vilnius	67 m	17	2016
33=	Aukštoji Smeltė		Klaipėda	66 m	20	2009
33=	Klaipėdos Burė		Klaipėda	66 m	20	2009
33=	Snow Arena		Druskininkai	66 m	-	2011
36	Architektu g. 67		Vilnius	65.5 m	16	1982
37	Church of St. James		Švėkšna	65 m	-	1905
38=	Architektu g. 77		Vilnius	63 m	16	1983
38=	1 Dragūnų St.		Klaipėda	63 m	19	2009
40=	Šventoji Church		Šventoji	62 m		
40=	Architektu g. 55		Vilnius	62 m	16	1983
40=	Vertas	Visible on the left.	Vilnius	62 m	15	2007
40=	Minijos Banga		Klaipėda	62 m	20	2007
44	Hotel Vilnius Park Plaza		Vilnius	60.8 m	17	1973 (renovation in 2003)
45	Architektu g. 59		Vilnius	60.5 m	16	1982
46=	The Small Sail (Vilnius Business Harbour Tower B)		Vilnius	60 m	17	2008
46=	Swedbank Central Office		Vilnius	60 m	16	2009
46=	Church of St. Francis of Assisi		Šilalė	60 m	-	1909
46=	Kauno g. 9A		Klaipėda	60 m	18	2009

== Proposed and under-construction buildings of over 60 meters ==
Building	City	Height	Floors	Expected completion year	Status
Vilnius Vertical	Vilnius	114.85 m	29	2026	Planned
Krokuvos 24, 26	Vilnius	111.4 m	29	?	Planned
Burė 4	Vilnius	???	17	?	Planned
Horizontai	Vilnius	87 m	22	2029	Under Construction
Church of St. John	Klaipėda	82 m	-	2027?	Planned
119 Minijos st.	Klaipėda	79 m	19	-	Planned
Laisves pr 58	Vilnius	76.3 m	20	2028	Planned
PC MEGA	Klaipėda	71 m	15	2023	Planned
Newton	Vilnius	60.16 m	18	2026	Under construction
