= Raduškevičius Palace =

Coordinates: 54°41′33″N 25°16′53″E

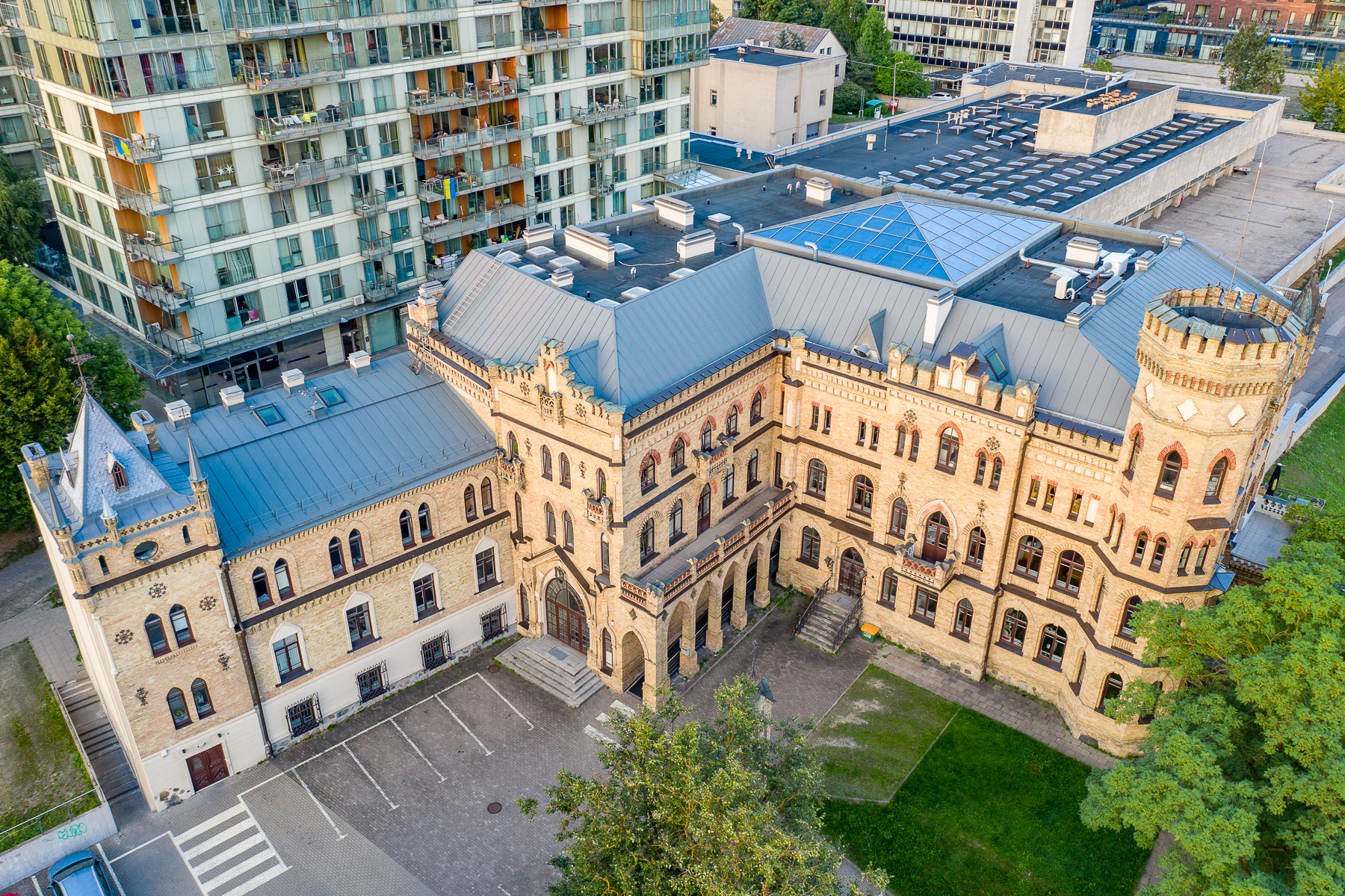
Raduškevičius Palace in 2023

Before partial demolish

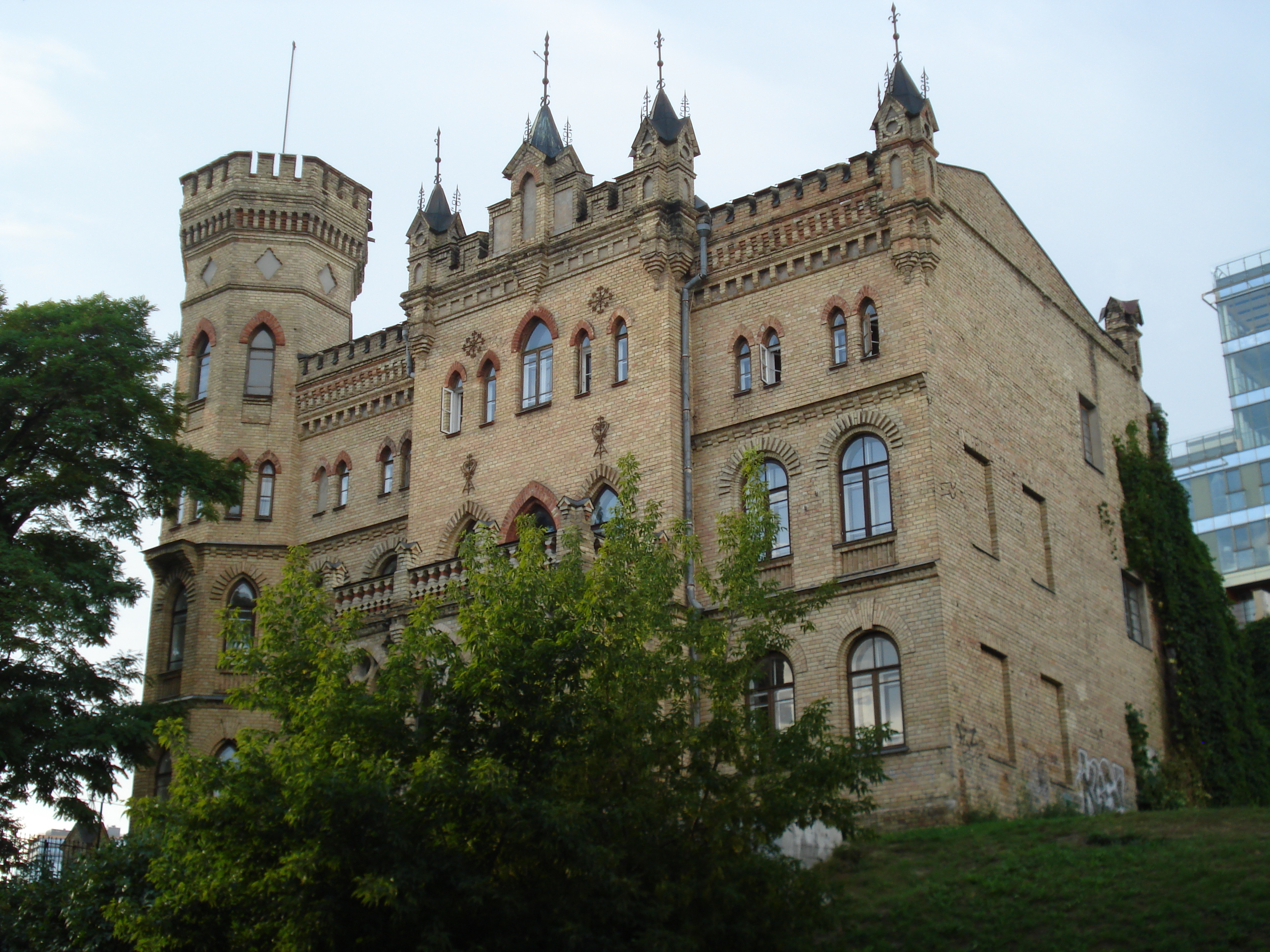
Raduškevičius Palace

The Raduškevičius Palace is a building in Vilnius, Kalvarijų st. 1. Currently it is headquarters of the Lithuanian Union of Architects.

== History ==
In 1894–1897, the Neo-Gothic Palace was built by famous doctor Hilary Raduszkiewicz based on a project by Julian Januszewski. In 1962–1963 the western and south-western hulls were demolished. From 2004 it is the headquarter of the Lithuanian Union of Architects. In 2013, the remaining part of the Palace was reconstructed.
