= Pilsotas =

- Interactive map of the Pilsotas area

General information
- Location: Klaipėda, Lithuania
- Coordinates: 55°41′28″N 21°8′49″E
- Construction started: July 2005
- Completed: May 2007

Height
- Roof: 367 ft (112 m)

Technical details
- Floor count: 34

Pilsotas is a 34-storey building in the Gandrališkės residential district of Klaipėda, Lithuania, completed in May 2007. It was designed by Donatas Rakauskas. It is the tallest residential building in Lithuania. The tower is named after a medieval Curonian land, *Pilsāts, encompassing the area in which it is located.

== Statistics ==
The tower's height is 367 feet (112 m) and it has 34 floors. Construction of the tower started in June 2005 and finished in 2007.

== See also ==
- Vilnius TV Tower
- Tallest buildings in Lithuania
