= Swedbank =

Swedish banking group

Swedbank AB

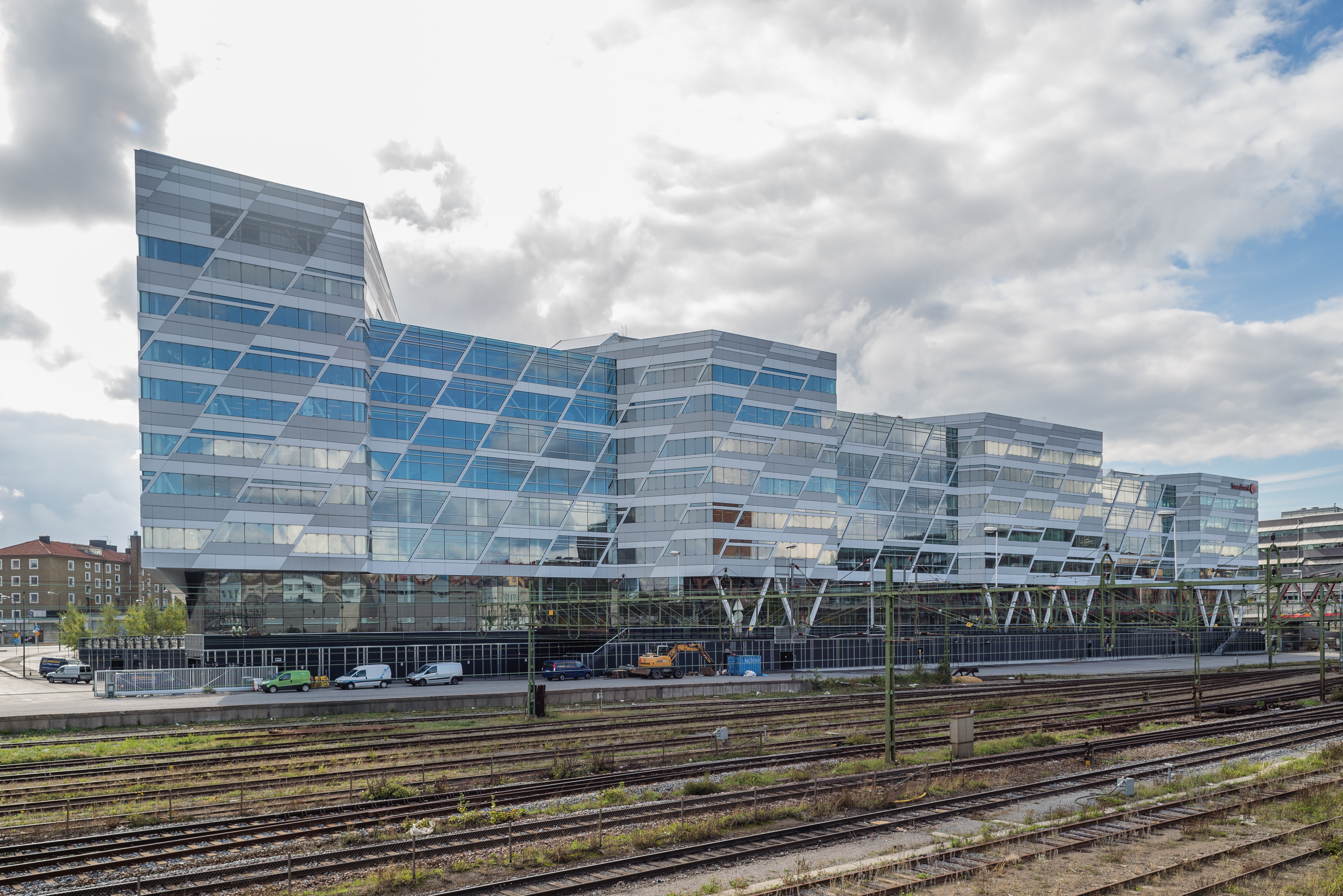
- Swedbank's global HQ in Sundbyberg (Stockholm), Sweden
- Company type: Publicly traded Aktiebolag
- Traded as: Nasdaq Stockholm: SWED; OMX Stockholm 30
- ISIN: SE0000242455
- Industry: Financial services
- Founded: 1820; 206 years ago
- Headquarters: Sundbyberg, Sweden
- Area served: Sweden, Estonia, Latvia, and Lithuania
- Key people: Göran Persson (Chairman); Jens Henriksson (President and CEO)
- Products: Retail banking, mortgage loans, corporate banking, merchant processing services
- Revenue: SEK68.736 billion (US$7.0 billion) (2025)
- Number of employees: 15,614 (FTE, 2019)
- Subsidiaries: Swedbank Estonia, Swedbank Latvia and Swedbank Lithuania
- Website: www.swedbank.com

Swedbank AB is a Swedish multinational banking group headquartered in Stockholm, Sweden. It operates primarily in the Nordic and Baltic regions, offering services such as retail banking, asset management and other financial services. Swedbank has extensive retail operations in Sweden, Estonia, Latvia, and Lithuania.

== History ==
The first Swedish savings bank was founded in Gothenburg in 1820. In 1992, a number of local savings banks merged to create Sparbanken Sverige ("Savings Bank Sweden"). In 1995, this bank was listed on the Stockholm Stock Exchange and in 1997, it merged with Föreningsbanken under the combined name FöreningsSparbanken (abbreviated FSB). During the 2008 financial crisis, Swedbank accepted government assistance due to its losses from loans made to neighboring Baltic economies.

On 8 September 2006, Föreningssparbanken AB changed its name to Swedbank AB. The name change took place in the afternoon local time, after the Swedish Companies Registration Office registered the changes in the company's articles of association. On the same date, the subsidiary AB Spintab changed its name to Swedbank Hypotek AB ("Swedbank Mortgage AB") and FöreningsSparbanken Jordbrukskredit AB changed its name to Swedbank Jordbrukskredit AB ("Swedbank Agricultural Credit AB"). Other subsidiaries will change their names at later dates.

In 2013 Swedbank closed its operations in Russia and sold its Ukrainian subsidiary.

In 2019 Swedbank had 900,000 private and 130,000 corporate clients and a 60% market share of Estonia's payments.

== Headquarters ==
The current Swedbank Headquarters was inaugurated in 2014 in Sundbyberg Municipality. The building was designed by 3XN.

== Organisation ==
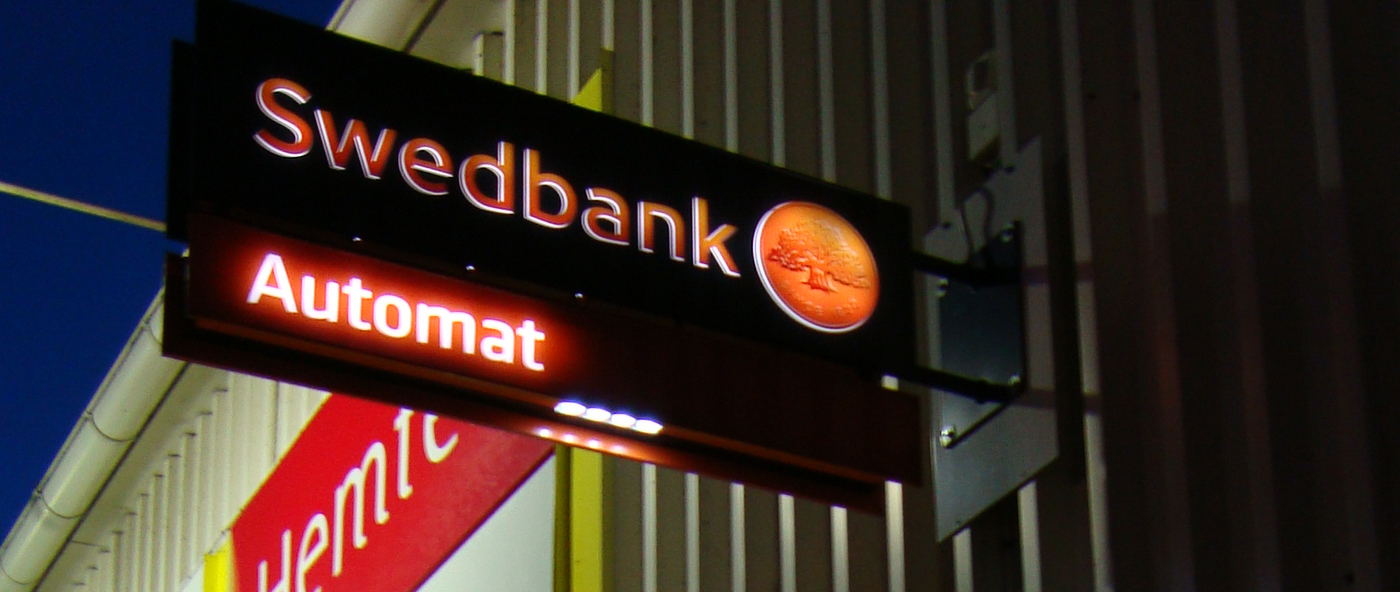
Swedbank sign above an automated teller machine in Karlskrona.

Swedbank in Vilnius CBD, Lithuania

Swedbank in Vilnius CBD, Lithuania

In 2023 Swedbank had 7.2 million retail customers and 555,000 corporate customers in Sweden, Estonia, Latvia, and Lithuania. The group has 226 branches in Sweden and in the Baltic countries. It also maintains a presence in Copenhagen, Helsinki, New York City, Oslo, Shanghai and Johannesbourg.

Swedbank has close cooperation with about 60 local, but still independent, savings banks who chose not to join during the 1992 merger. These banks use FSB logos and customers have the same access to independent banks and branches belonging to FSB. Two relatively large independent savings banks, including the one in Skåne, have chosen not to cooperate with Swedbank and continue to use the logo used by Sparbanken before the merger with Föreningsbanken.

Together with the independent savings banks, Swedbank has branches all over Sweden. The bank has more than 16,000 employees across its operations in Sweden and abroad. Jens Henriksson is president and CEO, while former Swedish Prime Minister Göran Persson is chairman.

== Market position ==
Swedbank is one of the primary banks in Sweden, together with Nordea, Handelsbanken, and SEB. In 2001, a deal to merge Swedbank (then FSB) with SEB failed as the European Commission thought that the merged company would have had too dominant a position in the Swedish banking market.

Swedbank is the largest bank in both Estonia and Latvia and second largest in Lithuania. As of 2025, the bank has 7 million private customers and 555 000 corporate customers. Swedbank has been plagued by low customer satisfaction for many years. The bank has consistently ranked in the bottom among Swedish banks for both private and corporate customers. Swedbank has had low customer satisfaction for many years during 2010s and 2020s.

== Regulatory issues ==
=== Money laundering ===
On 20 February 2019 Swedish broadcaster SVT revealed that Swedbank is under investigation for alleged link in money laundering scandal by Estonian authorities due to suspicious transactions through Danske Bank which is being investigated in Denmark, Estonia, Britain, France and the United States. Estonian authorities confirmed findings by SVT. At least 40 billion Swedish crowns (£3.3 billion) had been transferred between accounts at Swedbank and Danske in the Baltics between 2007 and 2015, SVT's Uppdrag Granskning investigative programme reported. Chief executive Birgitte Bonnesen was fired in March 2019 during the money laundering scandal and her severance pay was cancelled. The bank's chairman Lars Idermark resigned the following month. Swedbank was subsequently fined a record 4bn SEK ($380m) by Swedish and Estonian regulators. Swedish appeals court found in September 2024 former Swedbank CEO Birgitte Bonnesen guilty of gross fraud over her handling of anti-money laundering protocols in Estonia, sentencing her to 15 months in prison.

=== Sanction breaches ===
Swedbank Latvia AS was charged by OFAC in the USA with 386 apparent violations, totalling $3,312,120, breaching sanctions in relation to sending payments to Crimea through US Correspondent banks in 2015 and 2016, Swedbank settled, by agreeing in 2023 to pay $3,430,900 in penalties.

== Patron of the University of Latvia ==
Swedbank is a gold patron of the University of Latvia Foundation. Cooperation and support has been received from Swedbank since 2005 to promote the development of education in Latvia by donating to student events and activities. Major projects – Open Mind Research Fellowships 2007/2008. and 2008/2009. as well as annual support for the LU student festival "Aristotelis".

== See also ==
- List of banks in Sweden
