= Konstitucijos Avenue =

Street in Vilnius, Lithuania

- Aerial view of the Konstitucijos Avenue
- Native name: Konstitucijos prospektas (Lithuanian)
- Former name(s): Ukmergės, Justo Paleckio, Snipiska, Wiłkomierska, Вилкомирская, Повилейская
- Length: 1.2 km (0.75 mi)
- Location: Vilnius, Lithuania
- Postal code: LT-01055, LT-03502, LT-08105, LT-08106
- Coordinates: 54°41′50″N 25°16′19″E

Konstitucijos Avenue (literally: Constitution Avenue; Lithuanian: Konstitucijos prospektas) is a major transport artery of Vilnius, the capital of Lithuania. It goes through Vilnius Central Business District where many corporates have their local or regional headquarters.

Europa Tower, the tallest building in Lithuania, and Vilnius city municipality building are located on the Konstitucijos Avenue.

== Gallery ==
Aerial view

View from south

View from south east

Europa Square

At sunrise
