= Neighborhoods of Klaipėda =

Klaipėda in Lithuania has 60 districts:

- Alksnynė
- Bachmano dvaras
- Baltija
- Baltikalnė
- Bandužiai
- Birutė
- Bomelio Vitė
- Dangė
- Debrecenas
- Didžioji Vitė
- Dubysa
- Giruliai
- Joniškė
- Jūrininkai
- Kalotė
- Kaunas
- Kretinga
- Labrenciškė
- Laistų sodyba
- Laukininkai
- Liepoja
- Lietuvninkai
- Lypkių sodyba
- Luizė
- Mažasis Kaimelis
- Mažoji Vitė
- Medelynas
- Melnragė I
- Melnragė II
- Miškas
- Miško dvaras
- Naujamiestis
- Nemunas
- Neringa
- Pakrantės sodai
- Paupiai
- Pempininkai
- Plytinė
- Poilsio mikrorajonas
- Pušynas
- Rimkai
- Rotušė
- Rumpiškė
- Senamiestis
- Sendvaris
- Smeltė
- Smiltynė
- Šarlotė
- Šauliai
- Šilutė
- Švepelių sodyba
- Tauralaukis
- Universitetas
- Uostas
- Varpai
- Vėtrungė
- Vingio mikrorajonas
- Žardės piliakalnis
- Žardininkai
- Žvejybos uostas

In addition there are several neighborhoods which do not have municipal status of city district, see lt:Kategorija:Klaipėdos miesto teritorijos

- Barškiai
- Budelkiemis
- Dauguliai
- Gandrališkės
- Gedminai (Klaipėda)
- Kopgalis
- Mogiliovas (Klaipėda)
- Naujakiemis (Klaipėda)
- Sportininkai (Klaipėda)
- Sudmantai
- Virkučiai
- Žardė (Klaipėda)

- Baltija - a district in the southern part of the city. There are residential buildings and malls under construction in the southern part of the district.
- Bandužiai - a district in the southern part of the city. It was built in the 9-10th decade of the 20th century.
- Barškiai - a district in the eastern part of the city. It is a thinly populated district that has a bad connection to the city.
- Debrecenas - a district in the southern part of the city. It was built in the 8-9th decade of the 20th century.
- Eglė - a district in the southern part of the city. It was built in the 8-9th decade of the 20th century.
- Gandrališkės - a district in the southern part of the city. It is a new district and home to the tallest residential building in the Baltic States - Pilsotas.
- Giruliai - a district in the northern part of the city. It is located near the Baltic Sea
- Kauno - a district in the southern part of the city. The biggest mall in Klaipėda Akropolis in this district.
- Kopgalis - a district in the western part of the city. It is located in the Curonian Spit
- Laukininkai - a district in the southern part of the city. It has one of the biggest night clubs in Lithuania, "Kalifornija"
- Lypkiai - a district in the eastern part of the city. It is located in Klaipėda Free Economic Zone.
- Mažasis Kaimelis - a district in the northern part of the city. It has a lot of luxurious private houses and a few apartment houses.
- Melnragė - a district in the northern part of the city. It is connected to the sea. Klaipėda's beach "Melnragė" is located in this district.
- Miško rajonas - a district in the northern part of the city. It is dominated by 5-12 storey apartment buildings
- Naujakiemis - a district in the southern part of the city.
- Pempininkai - a district in the southern part of the city. It is a densely populated district and it was built in the 8-9th decade of the 20th century.
- Rimkai - a district in the south-eastern part of the city.
- Sendvaris - a district in the eastern part of the city.
- Smeltė - a district in the southern part of the city, near the Curonian Lagoon
- Smiltynė - a district in the western part of the city. It is located in the Curonian Spit in south of Kopgalio district.
- Sportininkų - a district in the northern part of the city. It is the home to the biggest football stadium in Klaipėda, Žalgiris Stadium
- Sudmantai - a district in the eastern part of the city. It is a thinly populated district.
- Tauralaukis - a district in the northern part of the city.
- Trinyčiai - a district in the eastern part of the city.
- Virkučiai - a district in the northern part of the city.
- Šauliai - a district in the eastern part of the city.
- Švyturio - a district in the northern part of the city. It is located in harbour territory.
- Žardė - a district in the southern part of the city. It was built in the 8-9th decade of the 20th century.
- Žvejybos uostas - a district in the southern part of the city.
