= Hosius =

Hosius or Hozjusz is a Polish surname. Notable people with the surname include:

- Hosius of Corduba (c. 257–359), bishop, leader of the First Council of Nicaea, and advisor of Constantine the Great
- Stanisław Hozjusz (1504–1579), bishop of Chełmno and Warmia, cardinal, and leader of the Counter-Reformation
  - Hozyusz coat of arms, used by several noble families in the Kingdom of Poland and Grand Duchy of Lithuania
- Stanisław Józef Hozjusz (1674–1738), bishop of Przemyśl, Livonia, Kamianets-Podilskyi and Poznań
- Ulrich Hosius (c. 1455–1535), mint-master, the horodniczy of Vilnius, and father of cardinal Stanislaus Hosius

== See also ==
- Hozjusz (disambiguation)
