= Hozjusz =

Hosius may refer to:

- Stanislaus Hosius (1504-1579), bishop of Chełmno and Warmia, cardinal and leader of the Counter-Reformation
- Stanisław Józef Hozjusz (1674-1738), bishop of Przemyśl, Livonia, Kamianets-Podilskyi and Poznań
- Ulrich Hosius (ca. 1455-1535), mint-master, horodniczy of Vilnius, and father of cardinal Stanislaus Hosius
- Hozyusz coat of arms, used by several noble families in the Kingdom of Poland and Grand Duchy of Lithuania

== See also ==
- Hosius (disambiguation)
- Hosius of Corduba (c. 257-359), bishop, leader of the First Council of Nicaea, and advisor of Constantine the Great
