= Šiltadaržio Street =

Street in Vilnius, Lithuania

Šiltadaržio Street is a narrow street about 130 meters long in the Vilnius Old Town. It connects Barboros Radvilaitės and Bernardinų streets.

== Name ==
The street was previously called Malūnų Lane due to the royal mill built nearby by Sigismund I the Old's privilege. The mill was constructed by Ulrich Hosius.

The mill was supplied with water from Vilnia. Later, the street was named Šiltadaržio Street due to the nearby Botanical Garden of Vilnius University.

== History ==
The building at Šiltadaržio St. 1 / Barboros Radvilaitės St. 5 is a three-story house with a Neoclassical facade. In 1667, the house belonged to the Vilnius Cathedral Chapter. In 1787, the building was acquired by the Černovski family. Jozef Černovski renovated the house. In the 19th century, the house was inhabited by students and staff of the University of Vilnius. In 1837, a third floor was added.

The building at Šiltadaržio St. 2 / Barboros Radvilaitės St. 7 was owned by the canon Antonavičius in the mid-18th century. It was a complex of residential and economic buildings with a brewery. In 1785, it was purchased by Rodkevičius, whose family lived there for one and a half centuries. Between 1795 and 1806, the house was rebuilt and expanded. It was further renovated in 1812–1814. After reconstruction in 1836–1837, the building was rented to a school, with shops and apartments established inside. In 1910, following the design by architect Augustas Klein, the warehouse next to the building was transformed into an attic with a loft. The two-story buildings were surrounded by an irregularly shaped closed courtyard with an arch leading to the street. The walls are made of brick and plastered, with a tiled roof.

At the corner of Šiltadaržio and Bernardinų Streets, on the right side, there is a two-story house dating from the 14th to 19th century. The second-floor windows on the southern and eastern facades are adorned with frames and niches. The house was reconstructed in the 17th century and belonged to the Vilnius Chapter since 1699. In 1819, the bishop Dederko became the owner of the house, and the building was renovated with his funds. The house was rebuilt in 1820–1829 and in 1896, forming a three-building complex, and was restored in 1972.

On the left side of the street, there is a blank wall connected to a high fence with a two-story building. The wall belongs to the Lopacinskių Palace complex.

Notable people who lived on Šiltadaržio Street include Lithuanian priest, organist, choir conductor, educator, and composer Teodoras Brazys and Lithuanian priest, folklorist, and social figure of the Vilnius region Pranas Bieliauskas.

At the third house, there was a protected chestnut tree, which grew until 2012.

== Present ==
There are a total of six houses on Šiltadaržio Street. Five of them have even numbers, and one has an odd number. The street houses the Toy Museum (Šiltadaržio St. 2), and Menų spaustuvė (Arts Printing House). The roadway is paved with clinker bricks. Traffic on the street is one-way, from Barboros Radvilaitės Street towards Bernardinų Street.

== Gallery ==
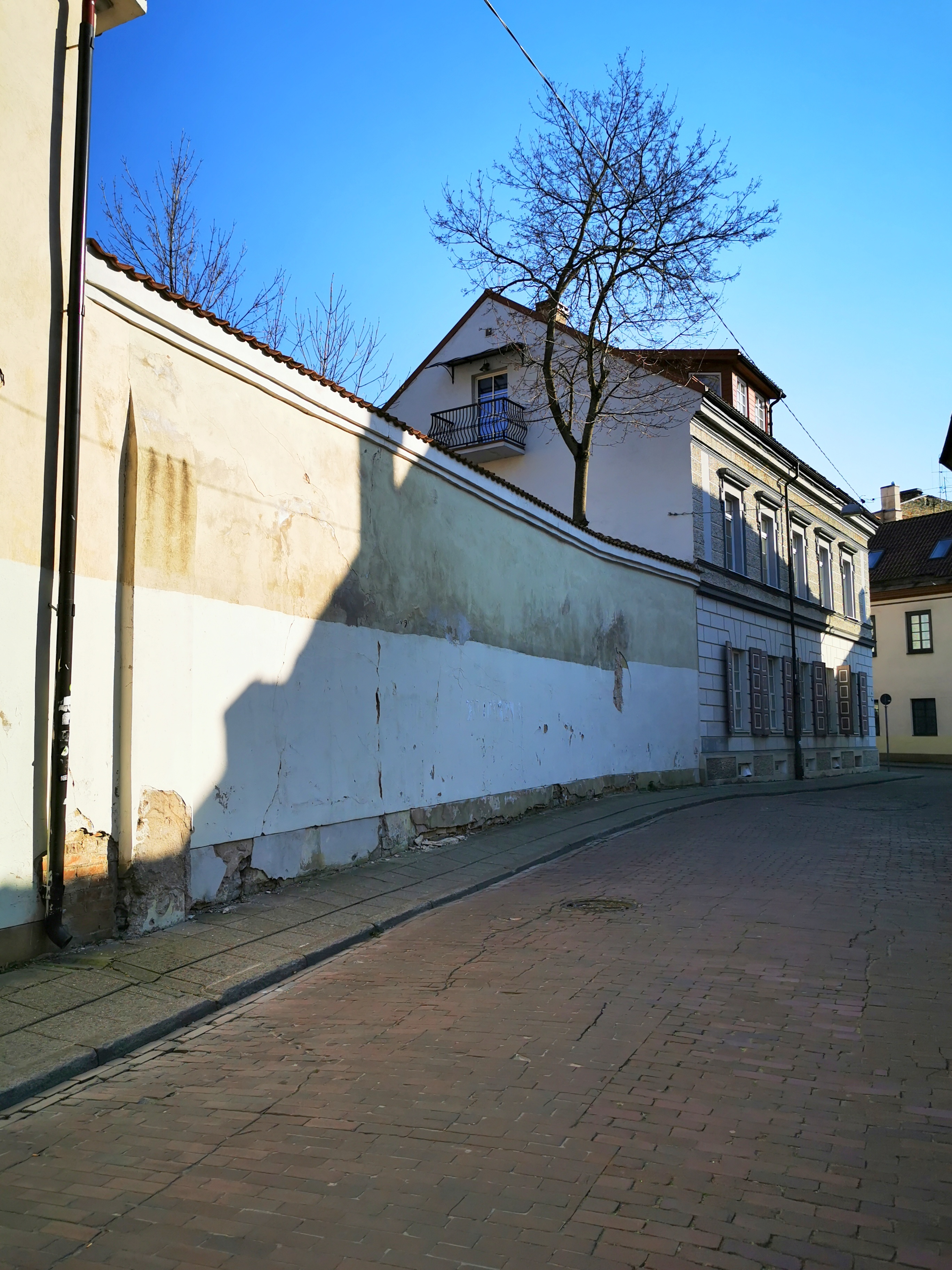
Wall of Šiltadaržio Street

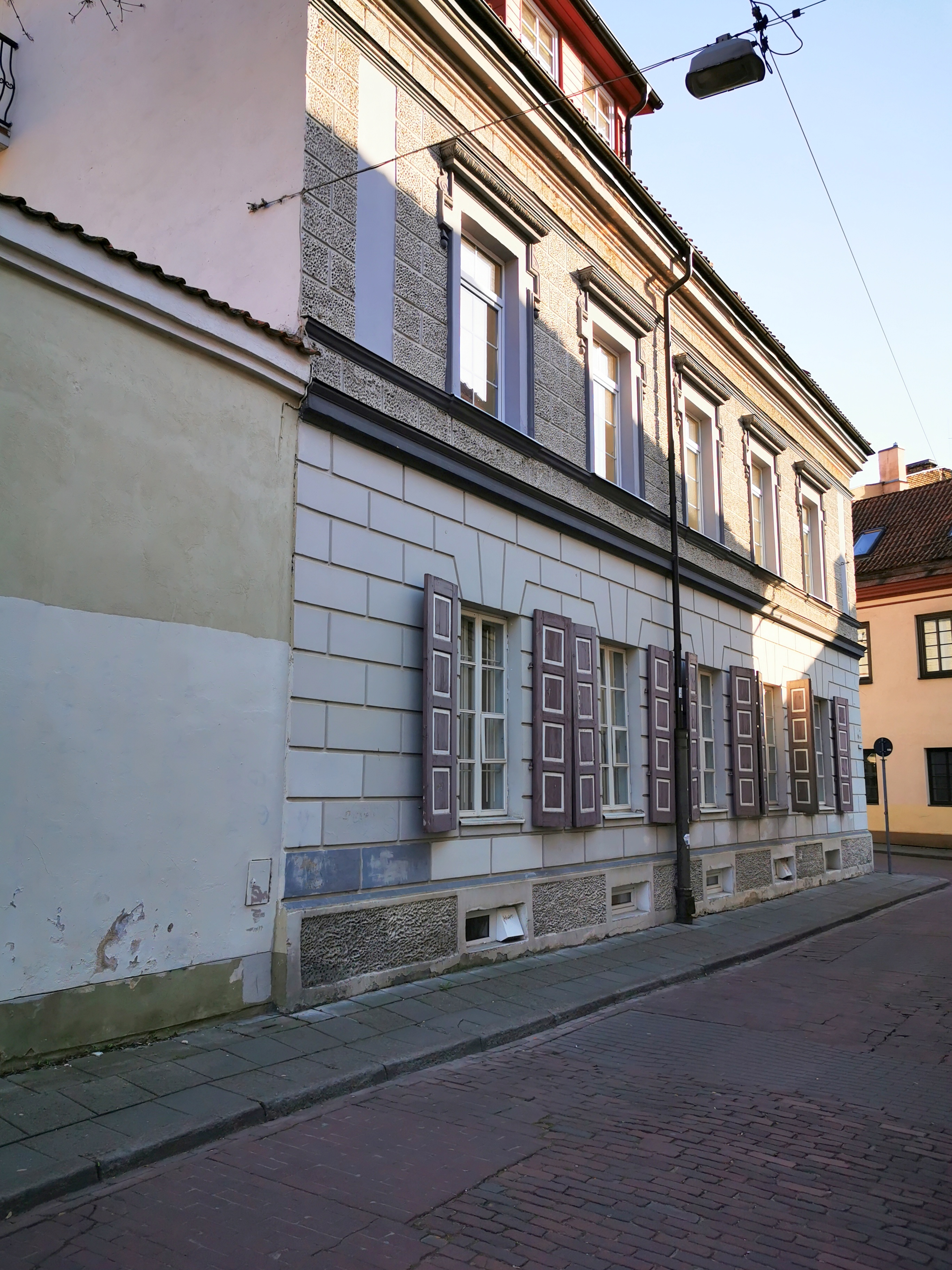
Corner building at Šiltadaržio and Bernardinų Streets

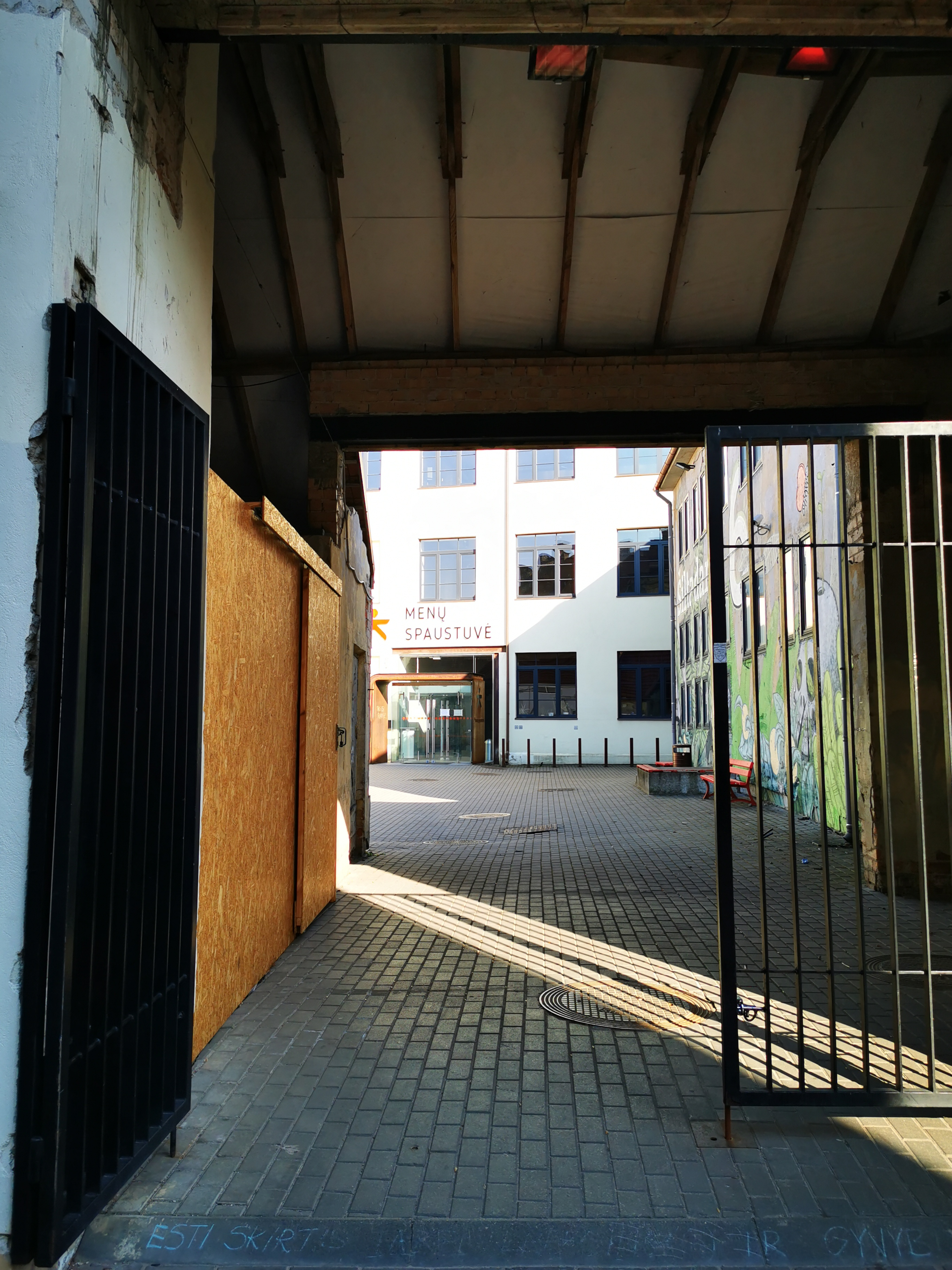
Courtyard at Šiltadaržio St. 6

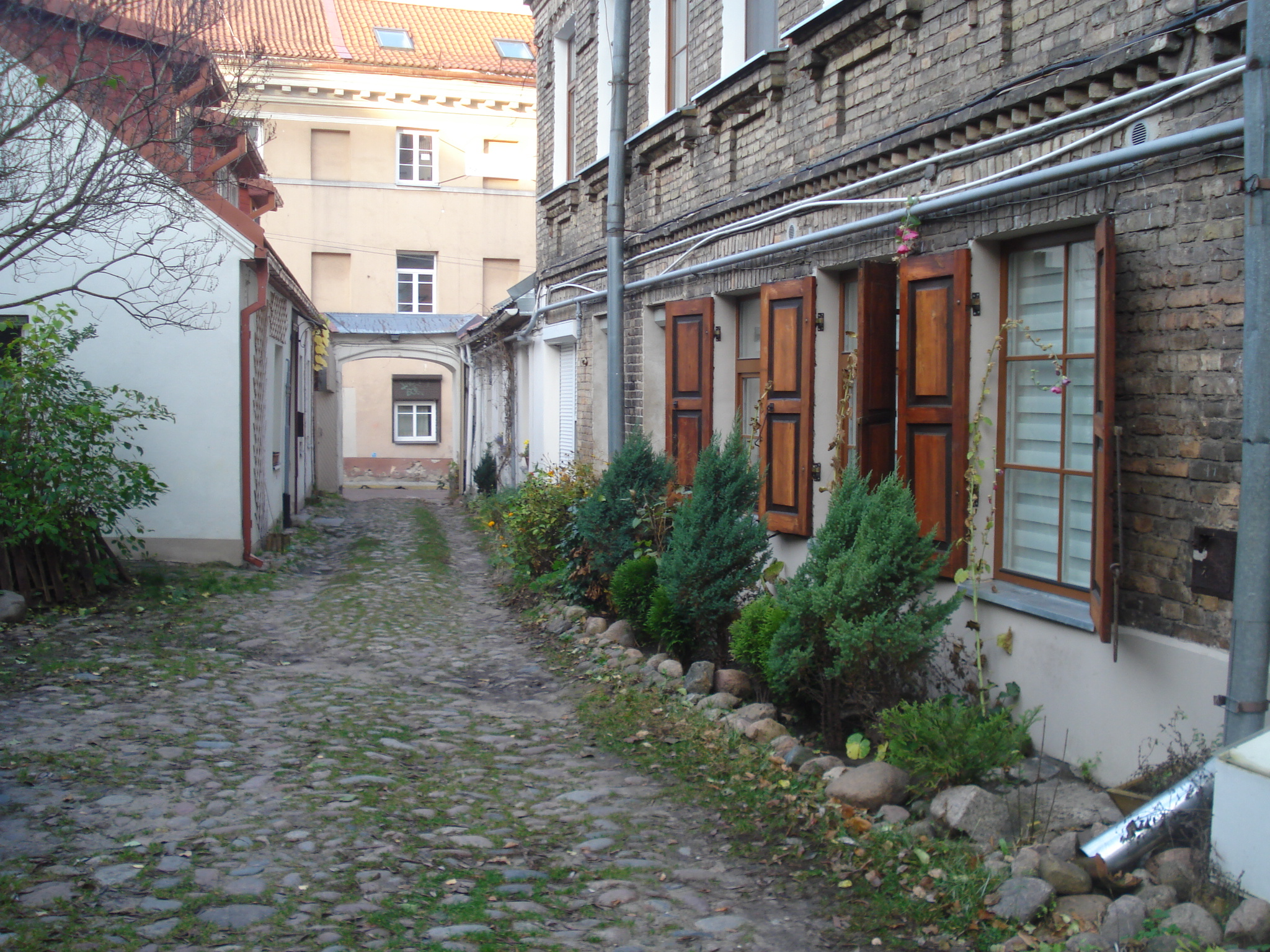
Courtyard at Šiltadaržio St. 4
