= Bezdonys Eldership =

Bezdonys Eldership Bezdonių seniūnija
- Eldership
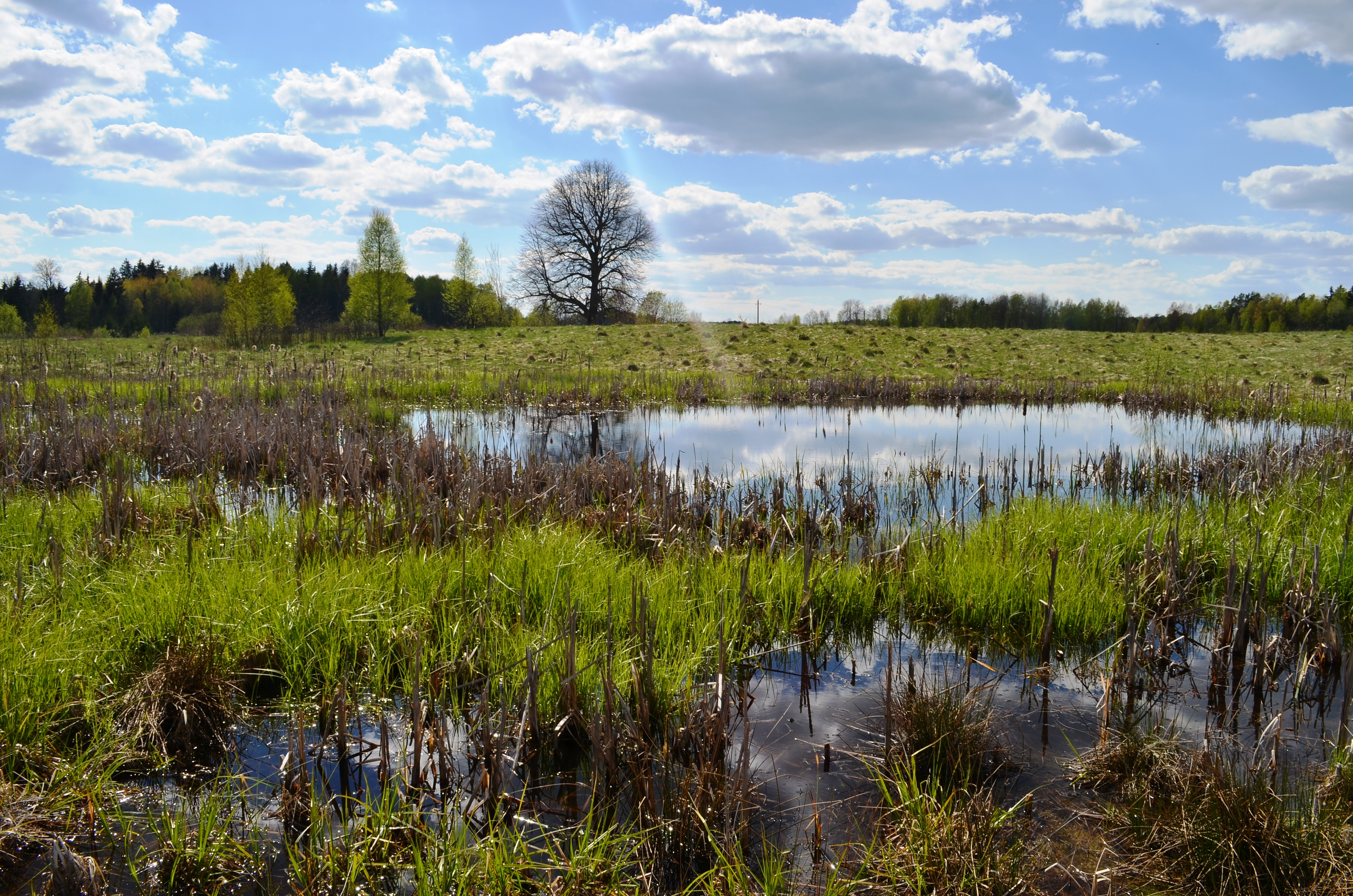
- Girdiškės swamp

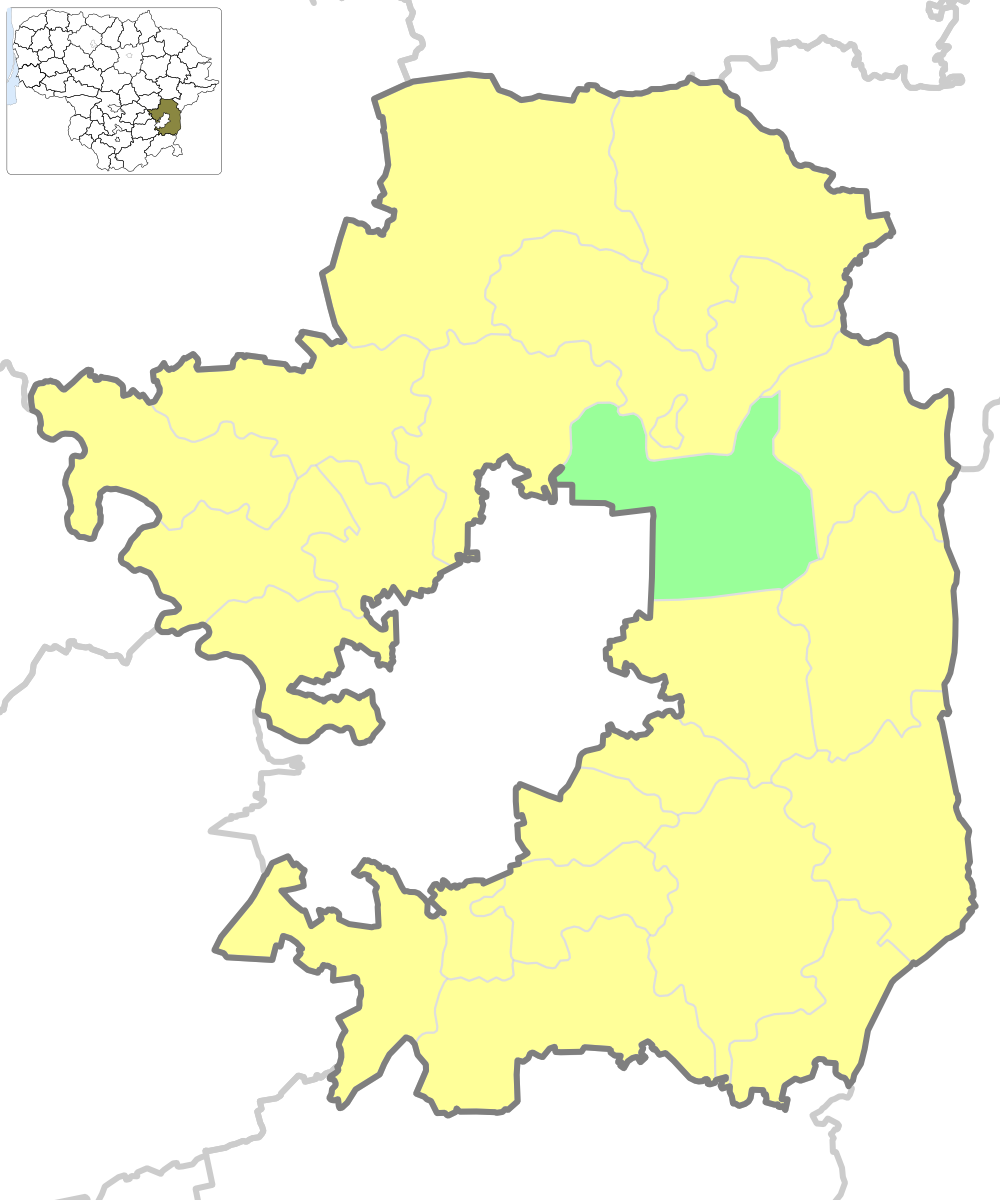
- Location of Bezdonys Eldership
- Country: Lithuania
- Ethnographic region: Dzūkija
- County: Vilnius County
- Municipality: Vilnius District Municipality
- Administrative centre: Bezdonys

Government
  - Elder: Michal Jančevski

Area
  - Total: 121.42 km^{2} (46.88 sq mi)

Population (2019)
  - Total: 2,886
  - Density: 23.77/km^{2} (61.56/sq mi)
- Time zone: UTC+2 (EET)
  - Summer (DST): UTC+3 (EEST)
- Website: https://www.vrsa.lt

Bezdonys Eldership (Lithuanian: Bezdonių seniūnija) is an eldership in Lithuania, located in Vilnius District Municipality, east of Vilnius.

== Etymology ==
The name is of Slavic origin, from Russian бездонный ("bottomless"). According to linguists, the name comes from a local hydronym Bedugnaitė and the village name written in a 15th-century Latin manuscript as Besdenayta/Besdonayta.

== Nature ==
The eldership is home to Skersabaliai State Geomorphological Reserve. Most of the eldership is in Neris-Žeimena Lowland, and reaches Neris River in the west. Rolling hills and flatlands dominate the landscape. Most of the area is covered by the Lavoriškės-Nemenčinė forest. The largest river is Bezdonė.

== History ==
Bezdonys are known historically since the 15th century, when Polish chronicler Jan Długosz noted that in 1415, Grand Duke Jogaila hunted in forests near Bezdonys. In 1516, a manor was built there, first owned by the Jesuits, and later the Educational Commission.

In the 16th century, Sigismund I the Old established the Arvydai-Bezdonys Manor and gifted it to a mint owner, and his son later gave the manor to the Jesuits. To this day, the classicist palace remains, and was privatized and restored in 2002.

In 1862, a railway line running from Warsaw to Saint Petersburg was built near the village of Bezdonys and a railway station was established there, and the village started to grow. By the end of 19th century, two factories were already operating in the area.

In 1937, a construction of a church in Bezdonys was completed.

In 1943, a Nazi concentration camp was established in a forest in the area.

The eldership was part of Nemenčinė District until 1962, when it was incorporated into Vilnius District.

In 2009, the eldership was subdivided into 9 subelderships (seniūnaitijos).

== Populated places ==
There are 27 villages located within the eldership, the largest of which are Bezdonys, Arvydai and Ąžuolinė.

== Ethnic composition ==
According to the 2021 census, out of 2790 inhabitants of Bezdonys Eldership:

Lithuanians - 1416 (50.75%)

Poles - 1008 (36.1%)

Russians - 196 (7.1%)

Belarusians - 81 (2.9%)

== Gallery ==
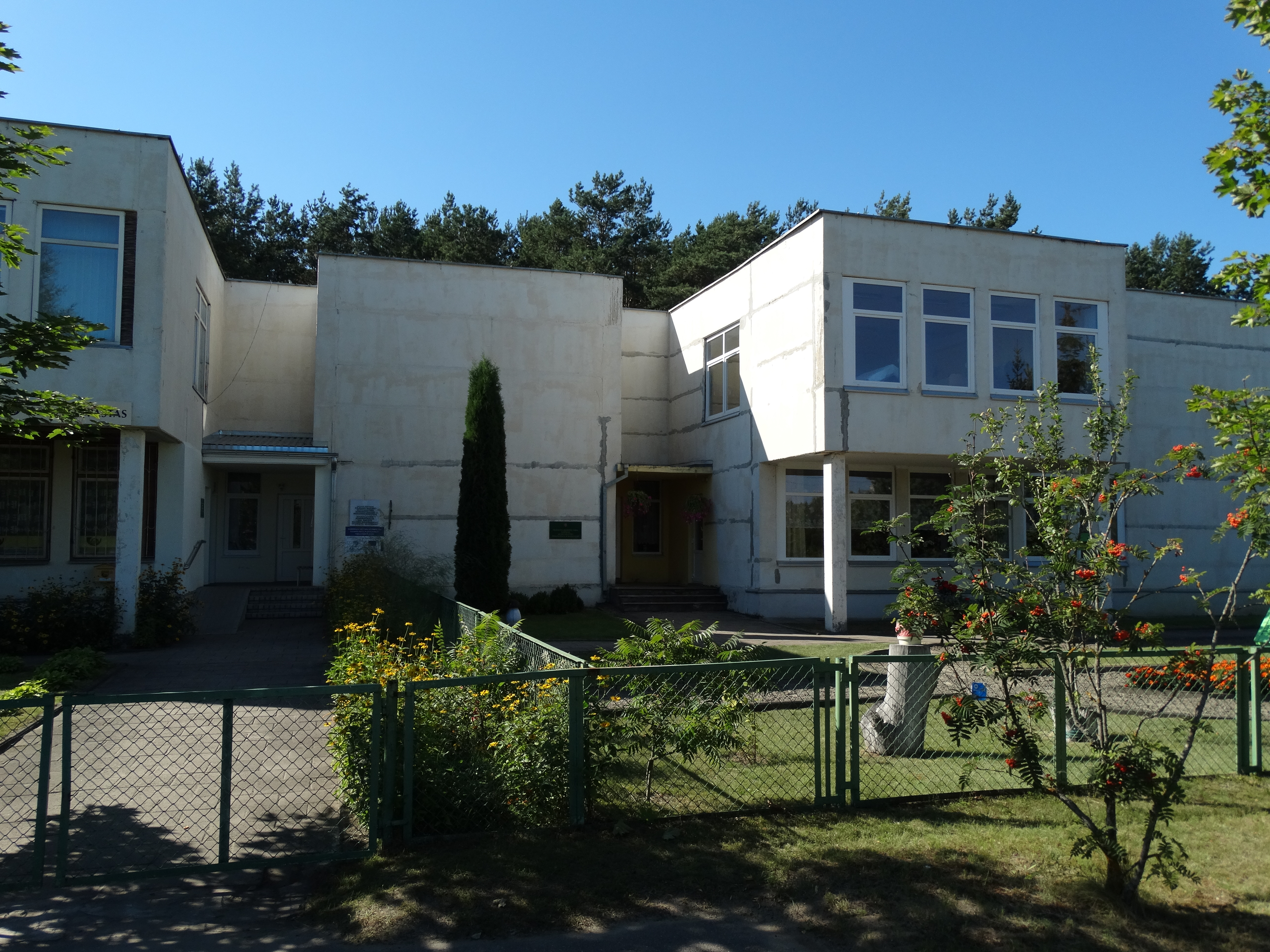
Bezdonys Eldership administrative building in 2016

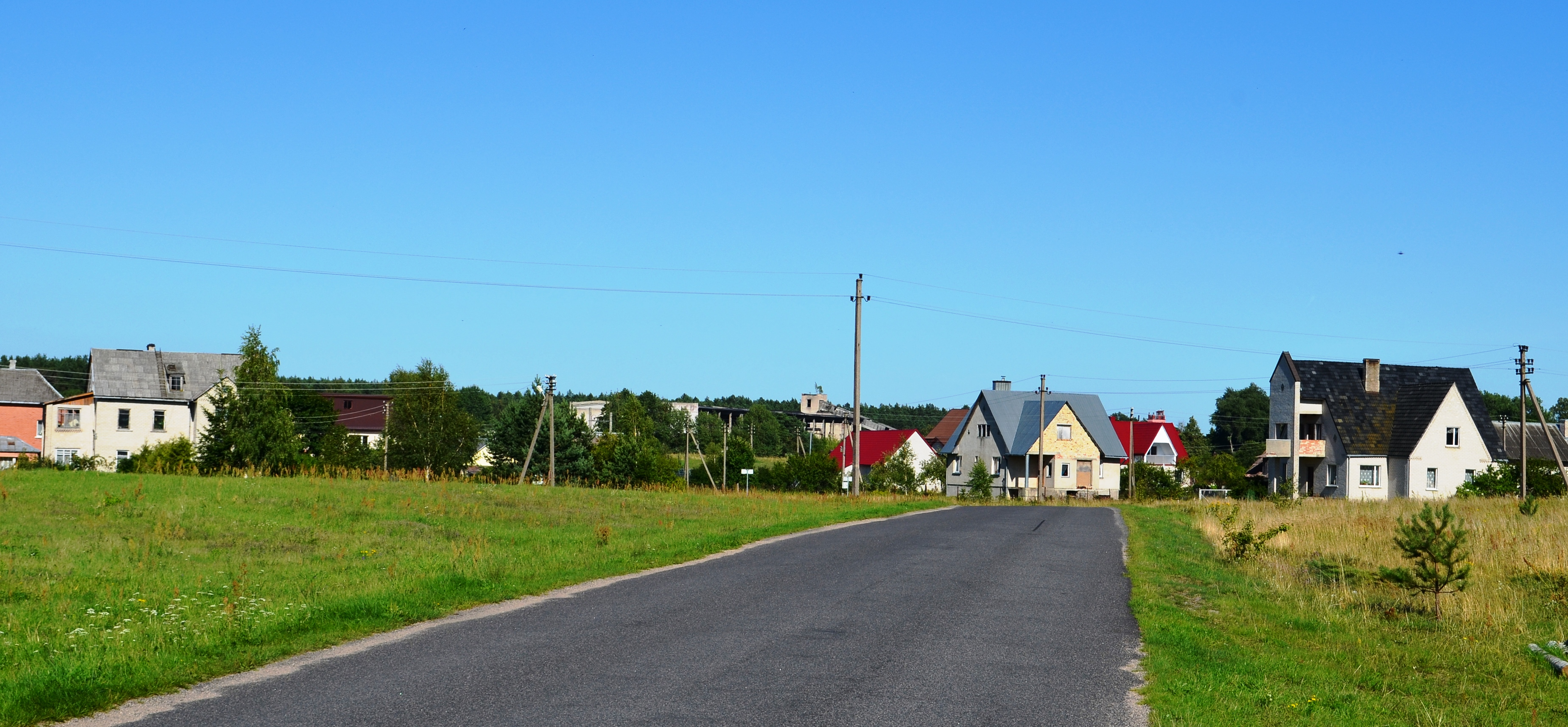
Bezdonys in 2015

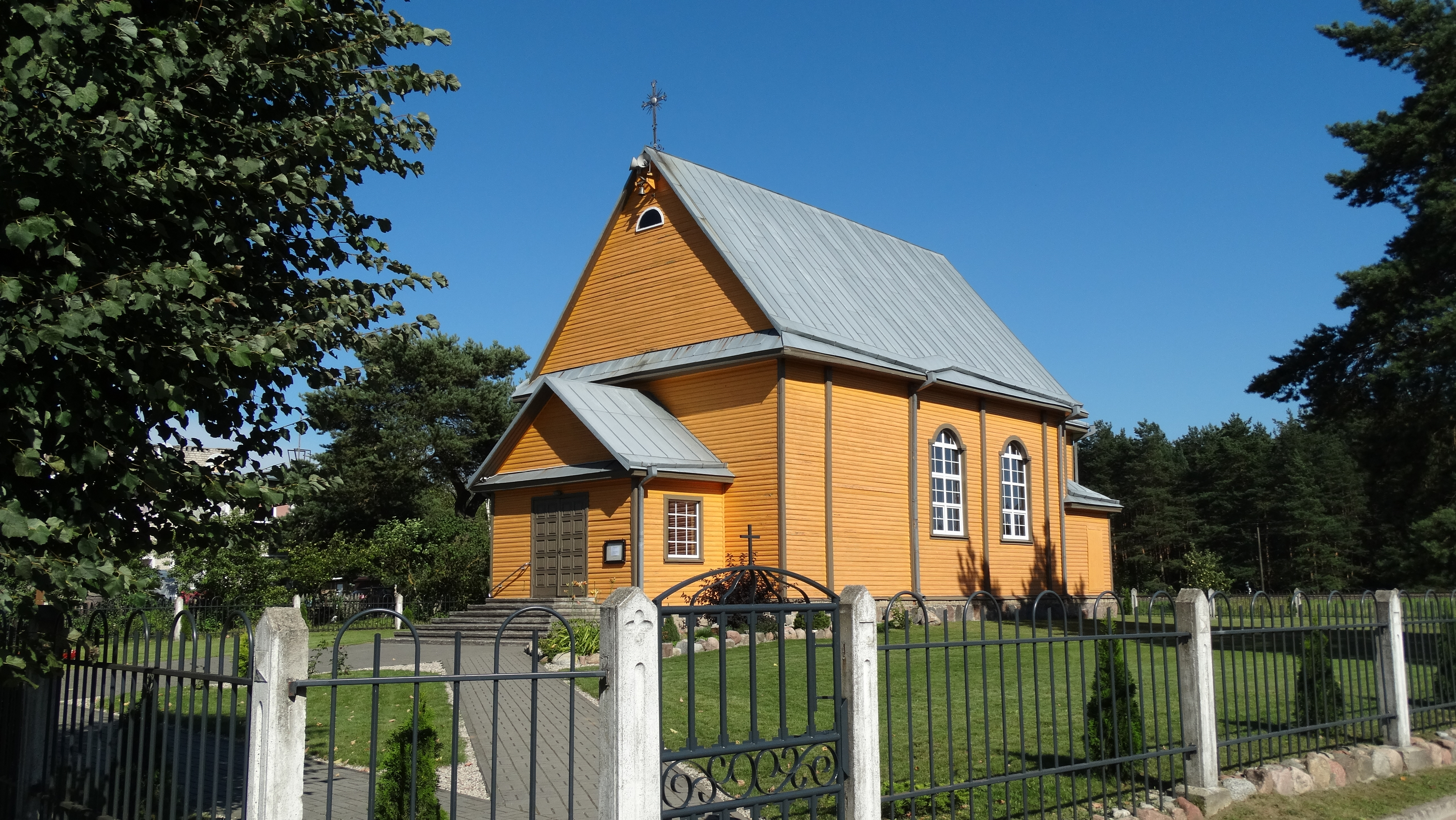
Bezdonys Church of Saint Virgin Mary, Mother of Mercy of the Gates of Dawn

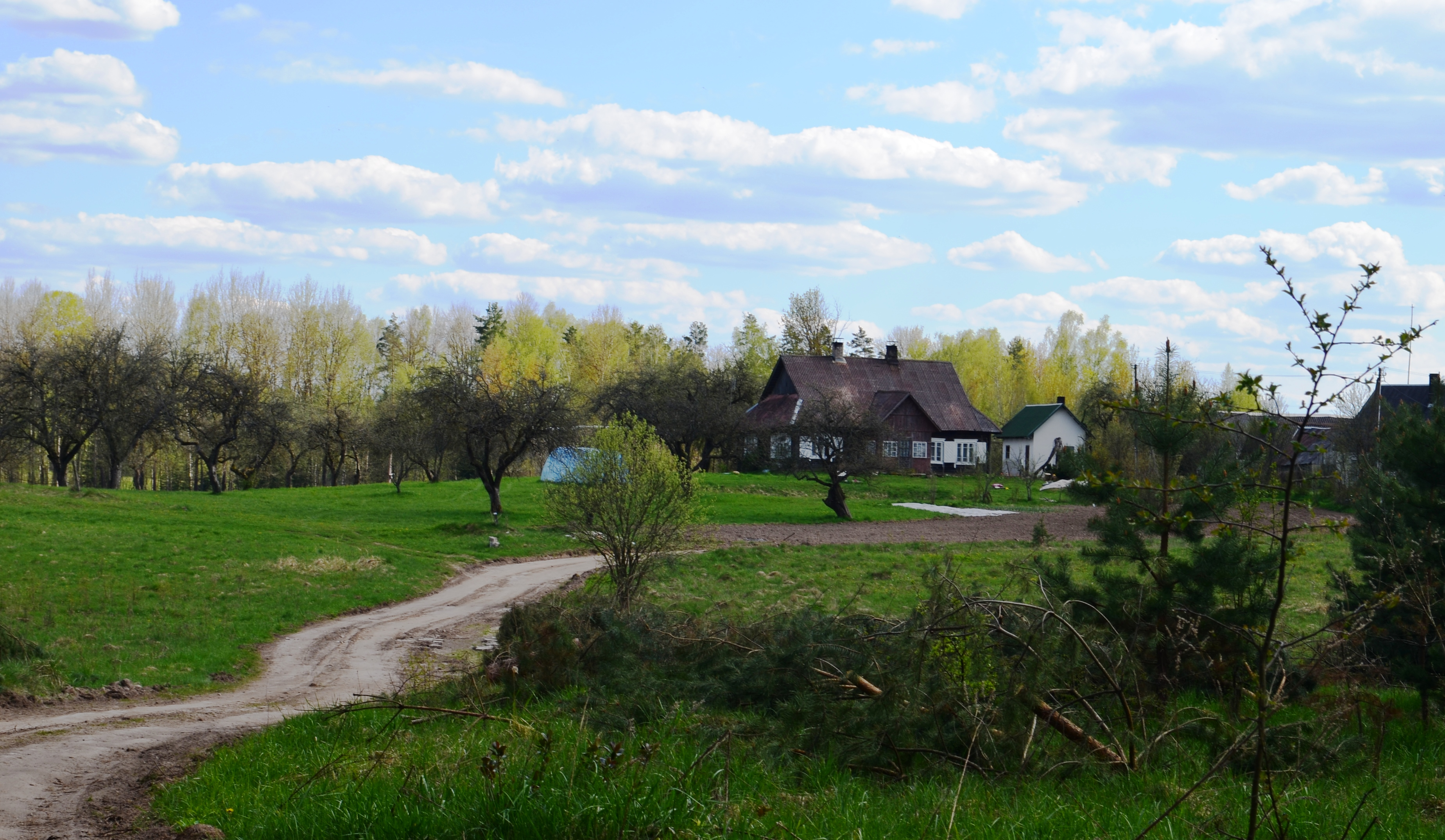
Jonėnai

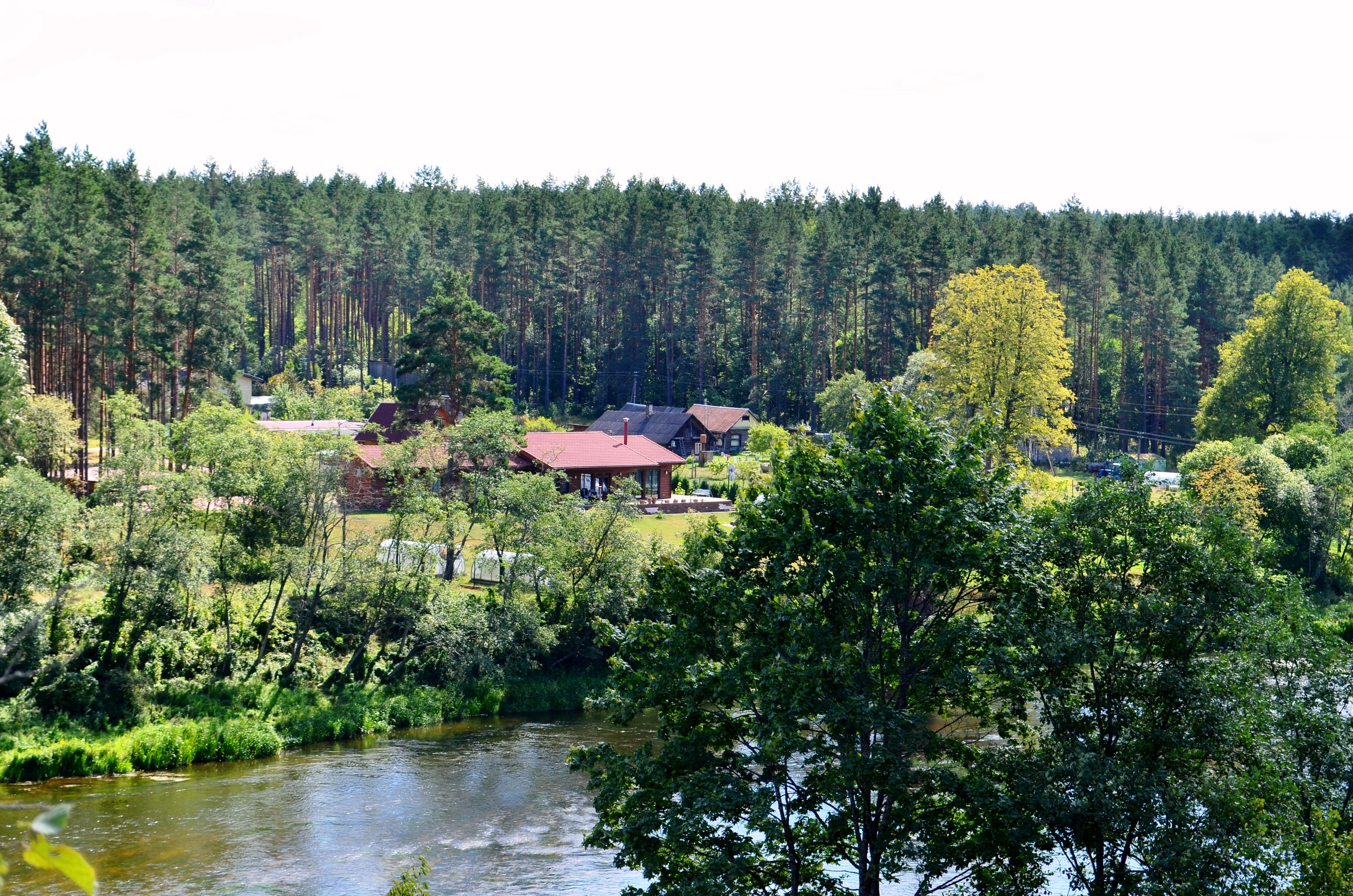
Bratoniškės

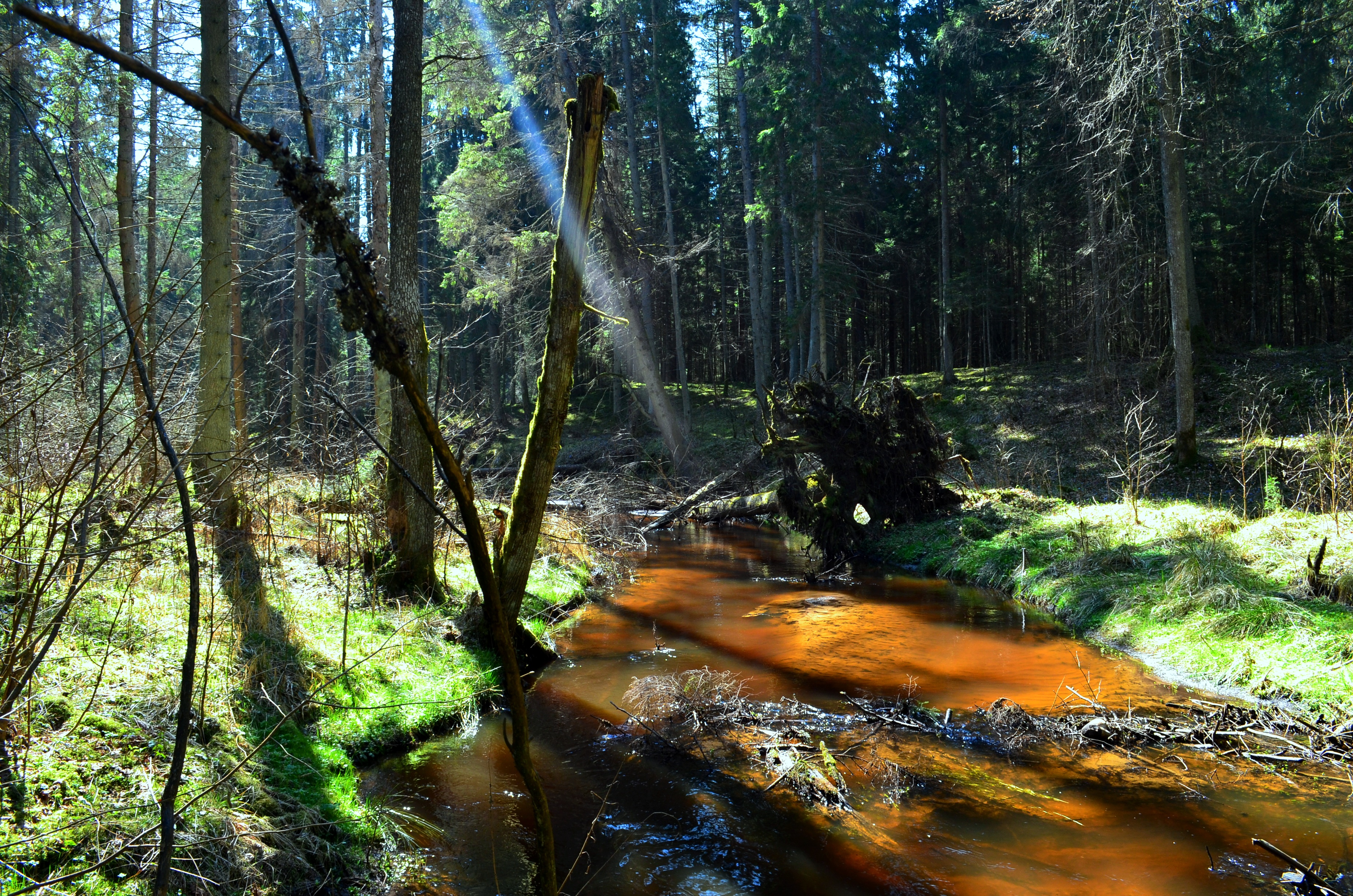
Bezdonė River

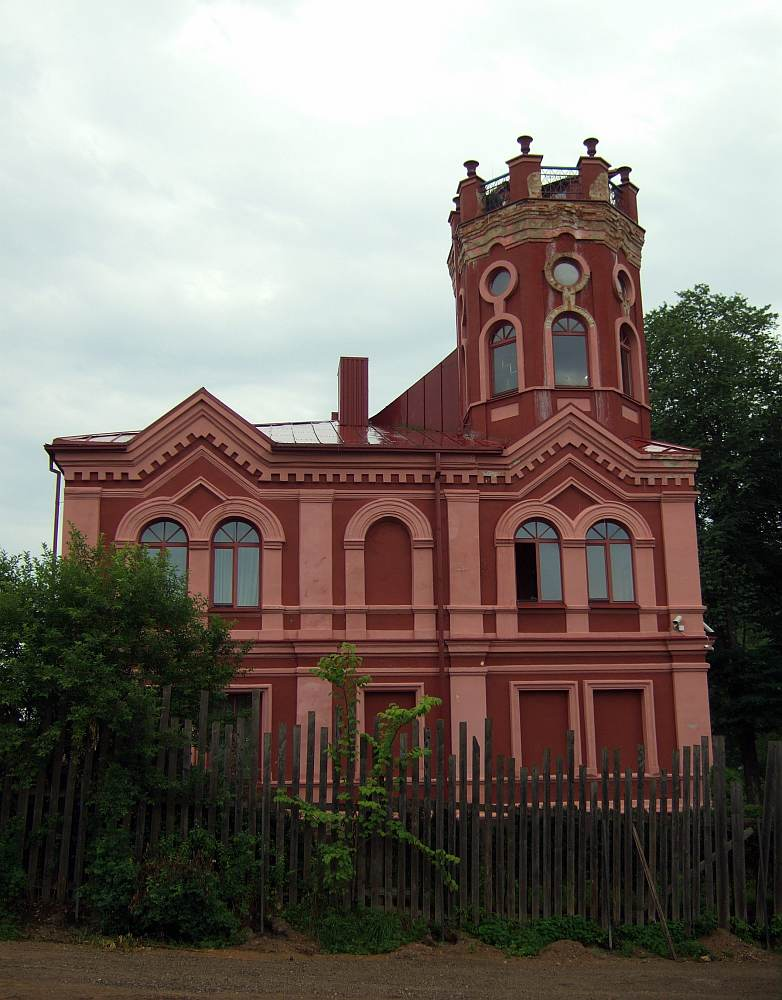
Classicist Arvydai-Bezdonys Manor
