= Kaunas Mint =

- Type: Coin mint
- Industry: Coin production
- Founded: 1665; 361 years ago
- Defunct: 1939
- Headquarters: Kaunas, Lithuania
- Area served: Grand Duchy of Lithuania, Lithuania
- Key people: A. G. fon Horn (governor), John II Casimir Vasa, Jonas Karys-Kareckas (governor)
- Products: Coins
- Owner: Grand Duke of Lithuania, Ministry of Finance of Lithuania

The Kaunas Mint (Lithuanian: Kauno monetų kalykla) was a Lithuanian mint which produced coins in Kaunas that operated between 1665 and 1667 and again between 1936 and 1939.

== History ==
The mint was founded on 17 October 1665, during the reign of Grand Duke John II Casimir Vasa of the Grand Duchy of Lithuania. Building of the mint (10 × 25 meters in size) was located in Kaunas Town Hall Square and was governed by A. G. fon Horn, whose initials GFH were minted on the coins as well. It minted copper shillings (also known as boratynka). In total, more than 40 million coins were minted in the Kaunas Mint, until 15 January 1667.

In 1936, the Kaunas Mint was reestablished by the Ministry of Finance of Lithuania and produced coins from 16 May 1936 to 1939. In 1936, it minted bronze coins of 1, 2, 5 cents, silver coins of 1 Lithuanian litas (with the date of 1925), 5 litas (with a portrait of Jonas Basanavičius) and 10 litas (with a portrait of Vytautas the Great). In 1938, a commemorative silver coin, dedicated to the 20th anniversary of Independent Lithuania, was minted there. In total, more than 25 million coins were minted in the Kaunas mint, while coins, their stamps and blanks were made in Belgium. The mint was located on the ground floor of the building of the joint-stock company Spindulys, governed by Jonas Karys-Kareckas.

== Coins minted in the Kaunas Mint (Grand Duchy of Lithuania) ==
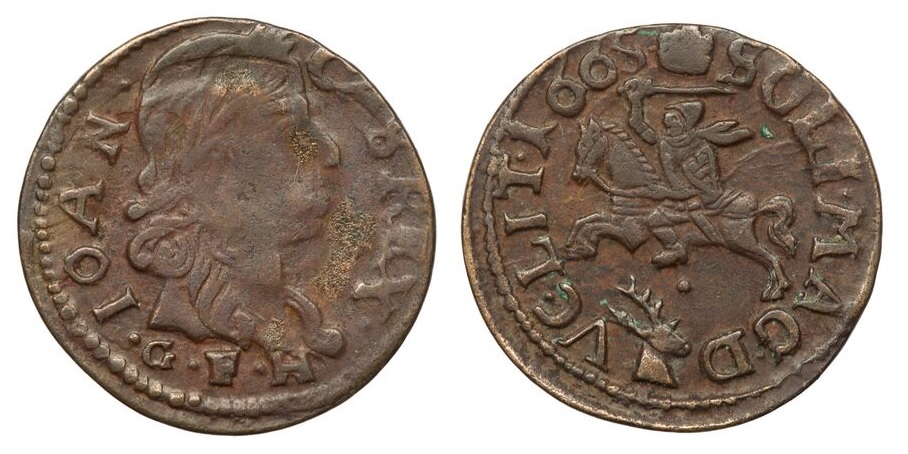
Minted in 1665

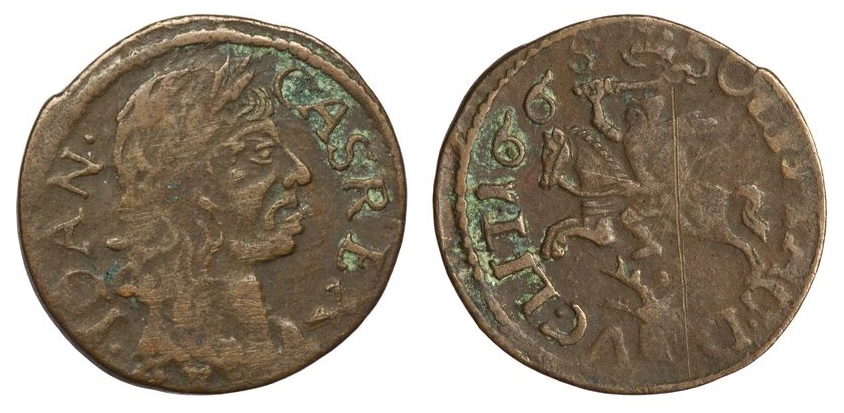
Minted in 1665

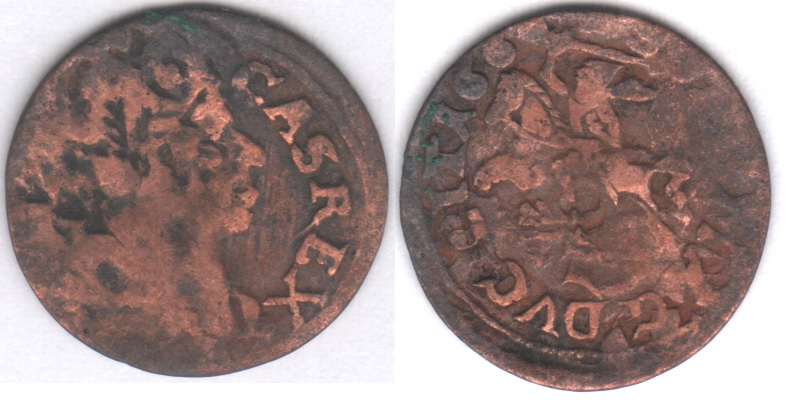
Minted in 1666

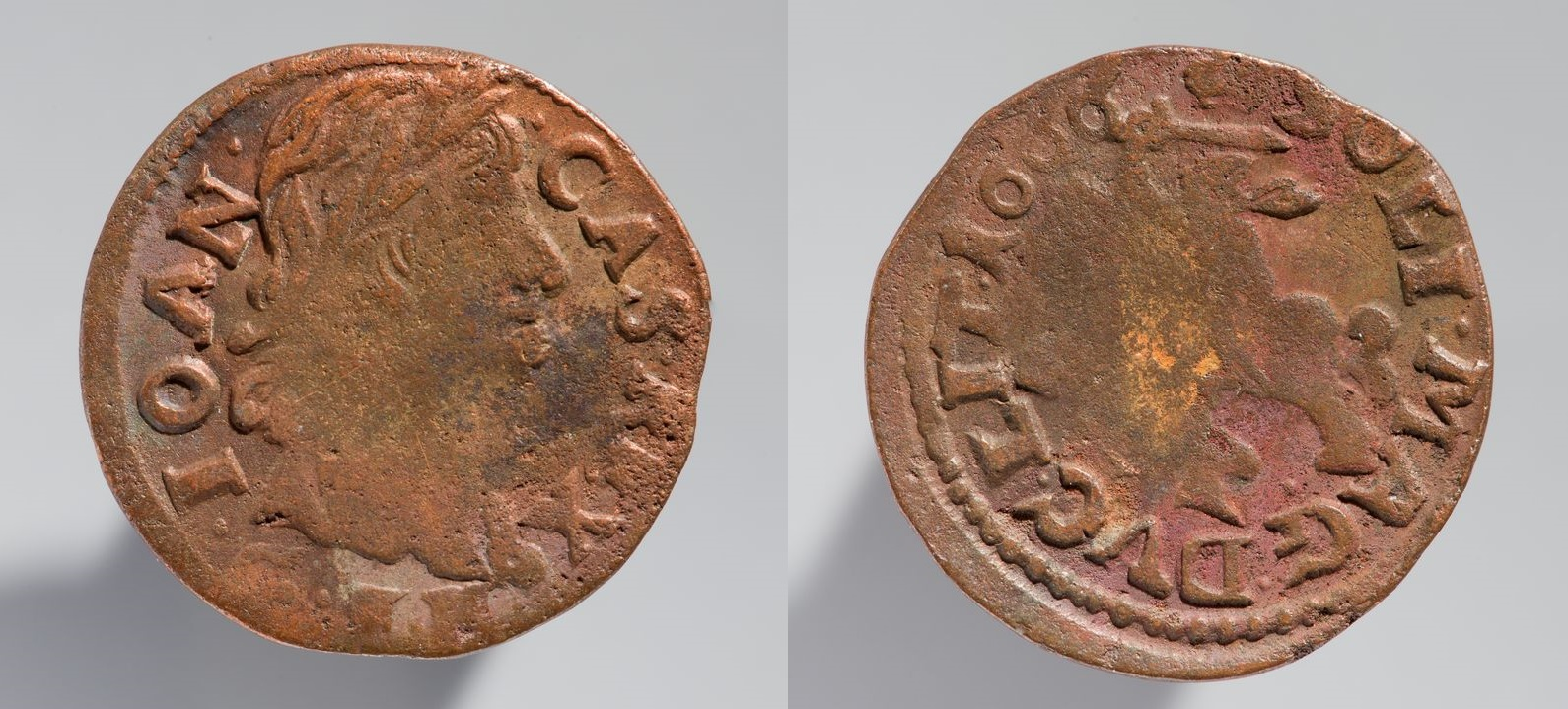
Minted in 1666

== Coins minted in the Kaunas Mint (interwar period) ==
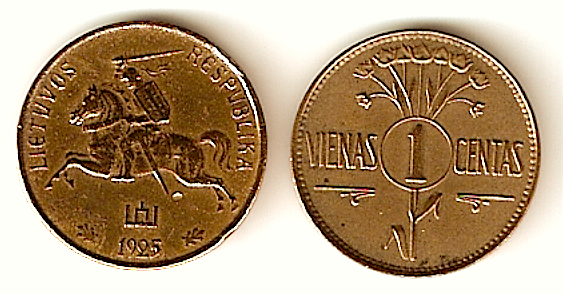
Coin of 1 Lithuanian cent with Vytis and the Columns of Gediminas

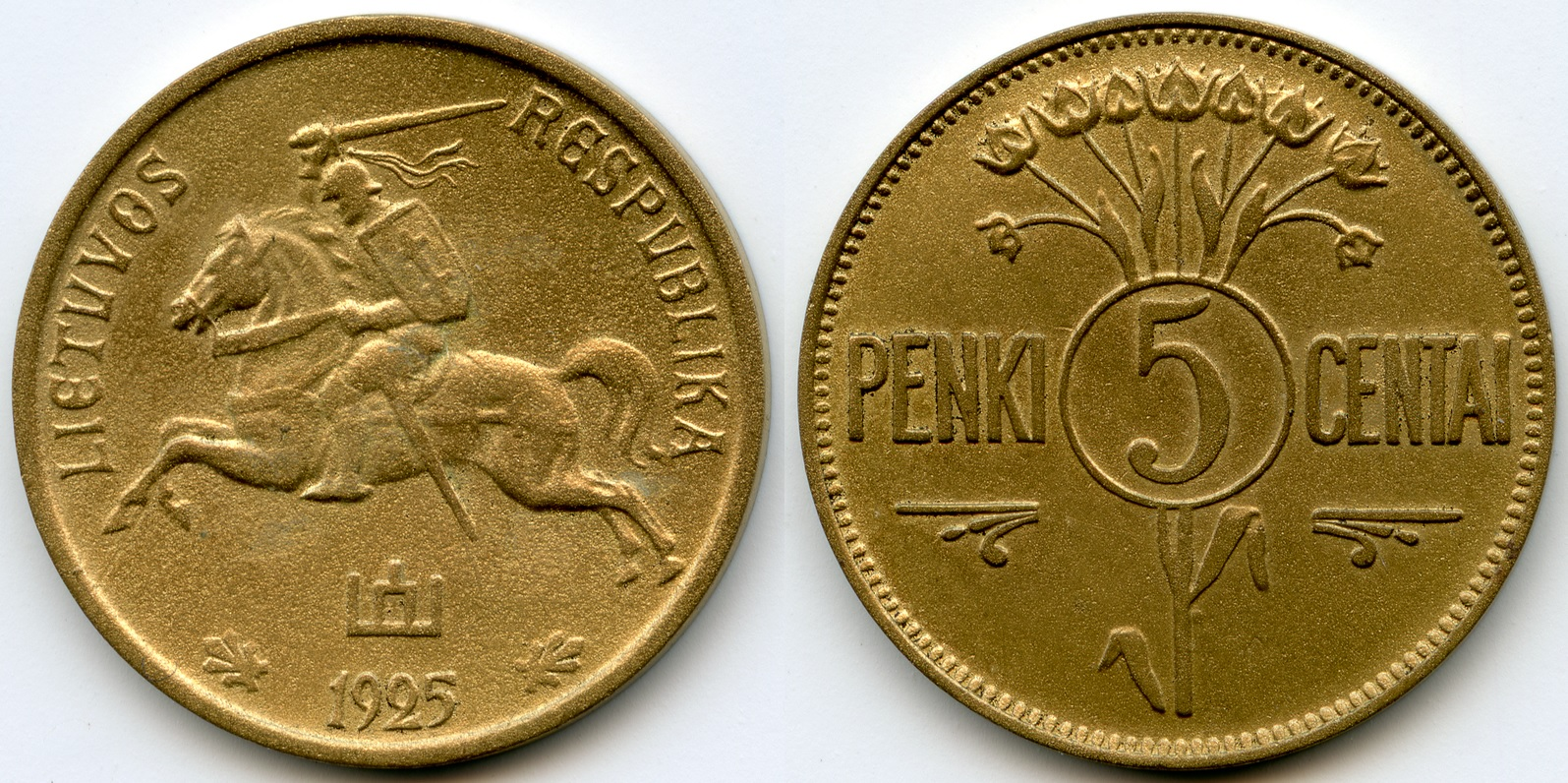
Coin of 5 Lithuanian cents with Vytis and the Columns of Gediminas

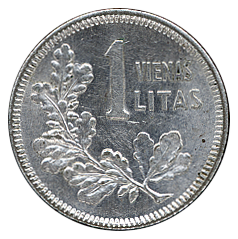
Coin of 1 Lithuanian litas

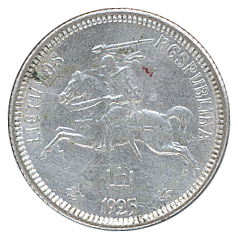
Coin of 1 Lithuanian litas with Vytis

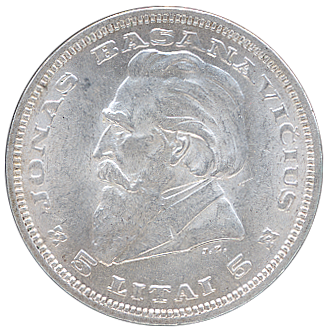
Coin of 5 Lithuanian litas with a portrait of Jonas Basanavičius

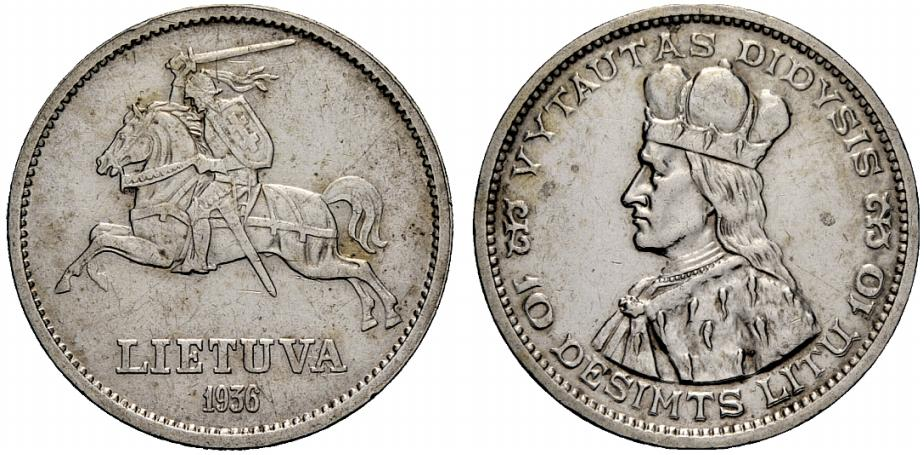
Coin of 5 Lithuanian litas with a portrait of Vytautas the Great and Vytis

== See also ==
- Vilnius Mint
