= Arvydai-Bezdonys Manor =

Coordinates: 54°47′54″N 25°31′10″E

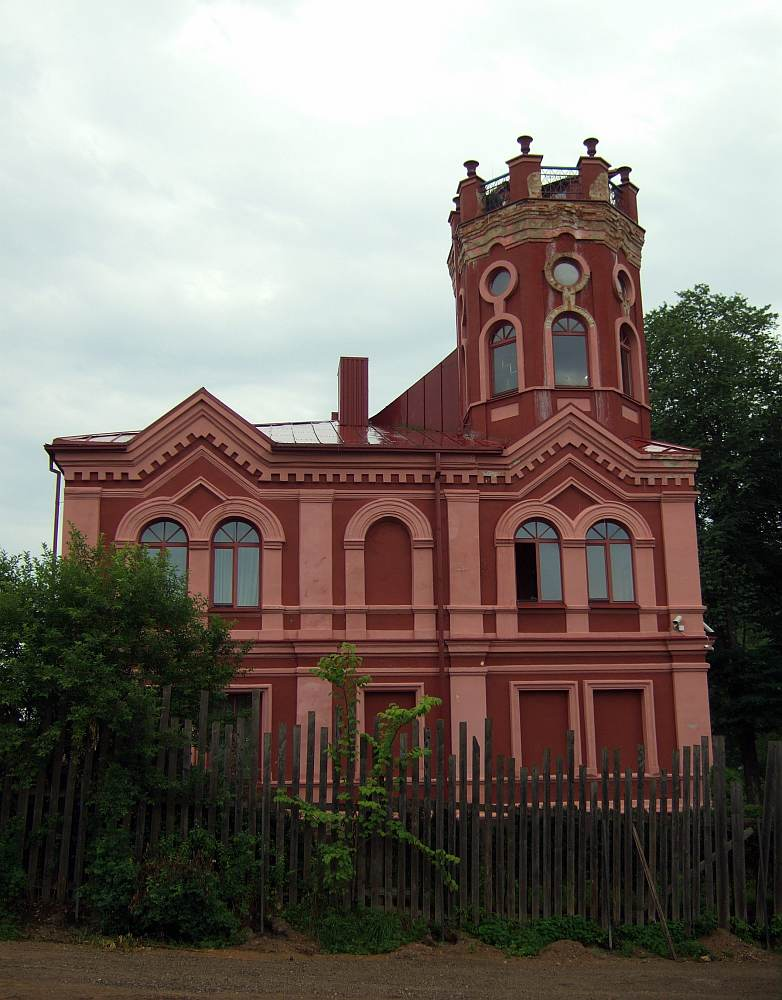
- Bezdonys Manor
- Interactive map of the Arvydai-Bezdonys Manor area

General information
- Type: Residential manor
- Location: Bezdonys, Lithuania
- Estimated completion: 15th century

Bezdonys Manor is a former residential manor near Bezdonys, Vilnius district in Lithuania.

== History ==
The manor is known from the 15th century, when, according to Jan Długosz, the Grand Duke of Lithuania Jogaila visited the manor in 1415.
