= Green Bridge (Vilnius) =

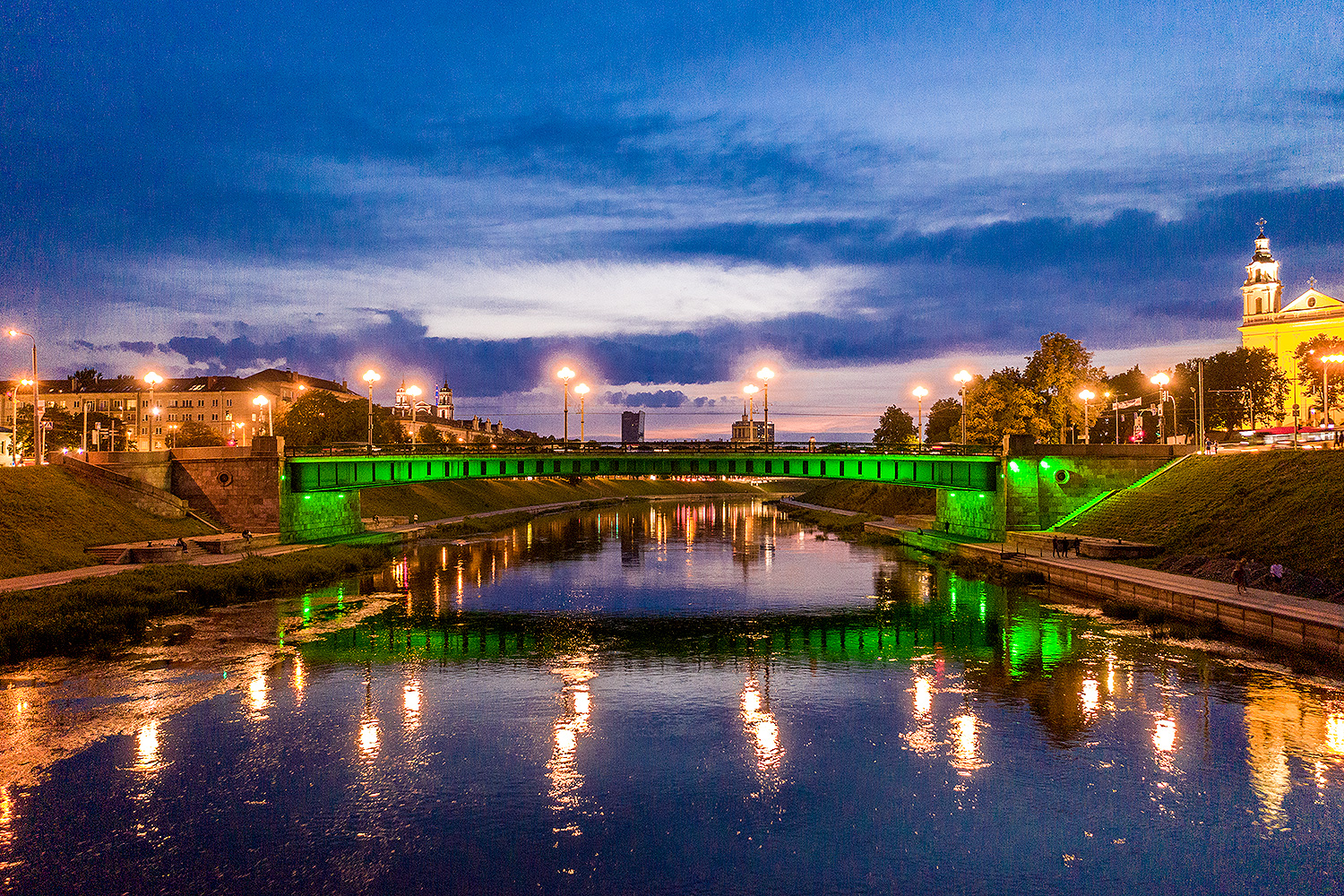
- Coordinates: 54°41′29″N 25°16′47″E
- Crosses: Neris River
- Locale: Vilnius
- Preceded by: Mindaugas Bridge
- Followed by: White Bridge

Characteristics
- Total length: 102.9 metres (338 ft)
- Width: 24 metres (79 ft)

Location
- Interactive map of Green Bridge

The Green Bridge (Lithuanian: Žaliasis tiltas) is a bridge over the Neris River in Vilnius, Lithuania, that connects the city center with the district of Šnipiškės. The original 16th-century bridge was the oldest bridge in Vilnius.

== History ==
The first bridge dated from 1536. It stood closer to the present-day Mindaugas Bridge. It was a wooden covered bridge with brick and stone piers. It had a second floor with apartments for toll collectors. Because its builder Ulrich Hosius wanted to recoup the cost by collecting tolls, Grand Duke Sigismund the Old granted him a privilege prohibiting others from building any other bridges across Neris between Kernavė and Bystrytsa (now in Belarus) or to offer other crossing services between Verkiai and Paneriai. The bridge was burned by retreating the Grand Ducal Lithuanian Army commanded by Janusz Radziwiłł after the Battle of Vilnius (1655).

A new project was planned in 1673, which envisioned a span of 73 metres (240 ft) between piers – the longest known span at the time. However, an early spring and ice jam destroyed the piers. Therefore, the old piers from the first bridge were reused and the second bridge was completed in 1679.

In 1739 another wooden bridge was erected and painted green. Since then this crossing has been known as the Green Bridge. In 1789 a new plan for a brick bridge was prepared by Laurynas Gucevičius, but the builders selected another proposal. The construction was supervised by Marcin Knackfus. The project was not successful as the bridge burned in 1791. It was rebuilt according to a plan by Michael Schulz in 1805, but it was burned again on orders from Michael Andreas Barclay de Tolly during the French invasion of Russia of 1812.

The bridge was rebuilt in 1827–1829. A steel bridge was designed by Nikolai Belelubsky and completed in 1894. It survived World War I, but was blown up by the Wehrmacht in 1944. The present-day bridge was completed in 1952 and named after Soviet General Ivan Chernyakhovsky. After Lithuania's declaration of independence in 1990, the bridge was returned to its historical name.

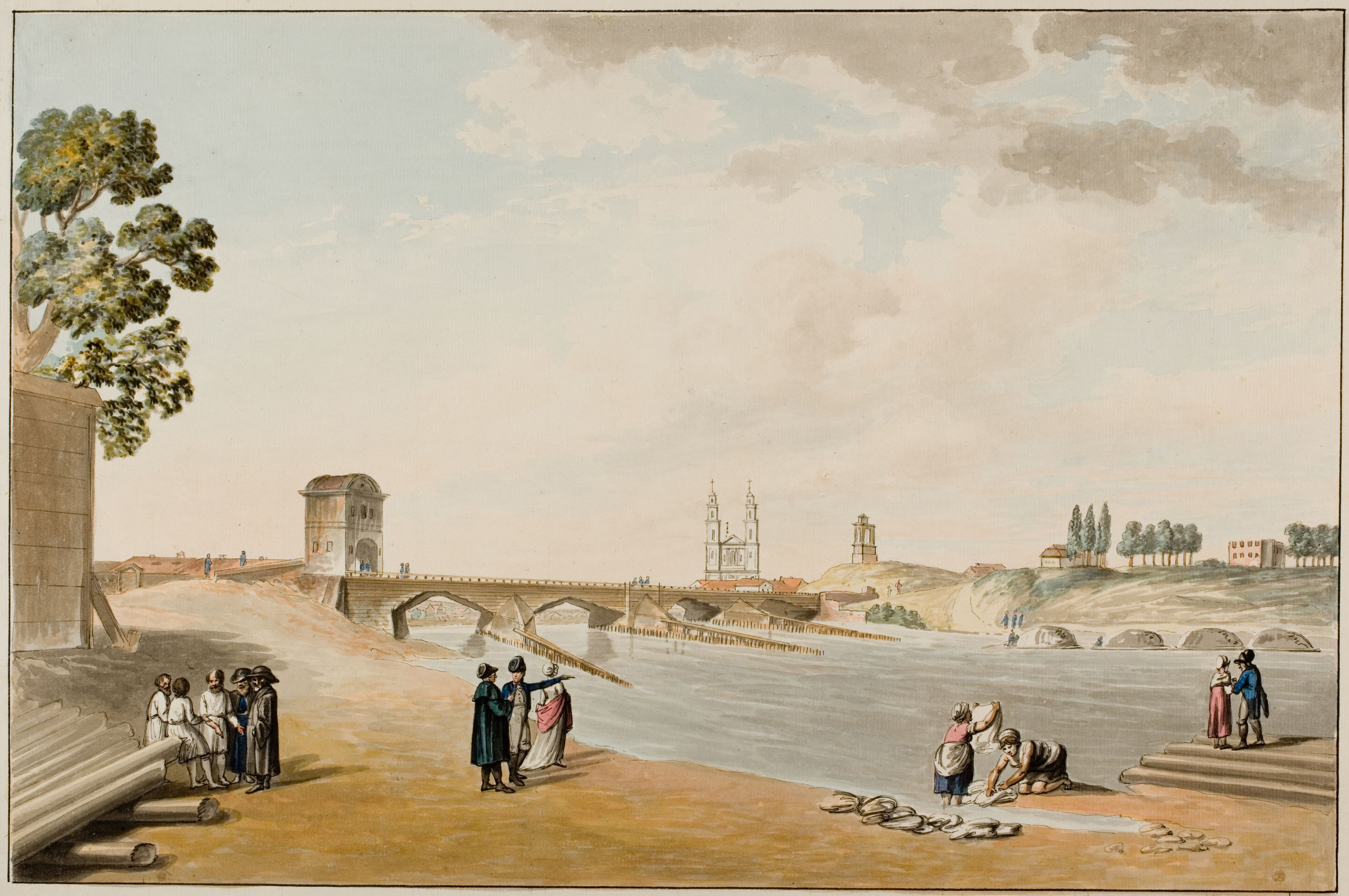
Bridge in the early 19th century

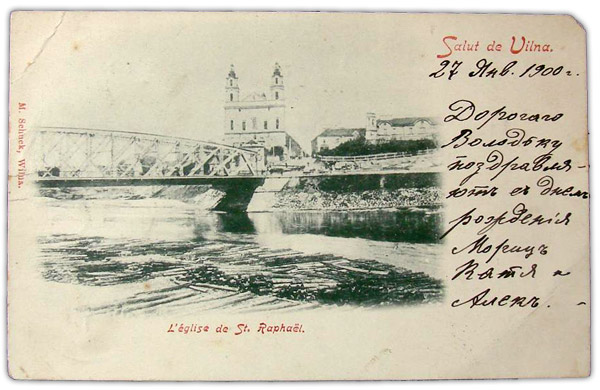
Bridge at the end of 19th century

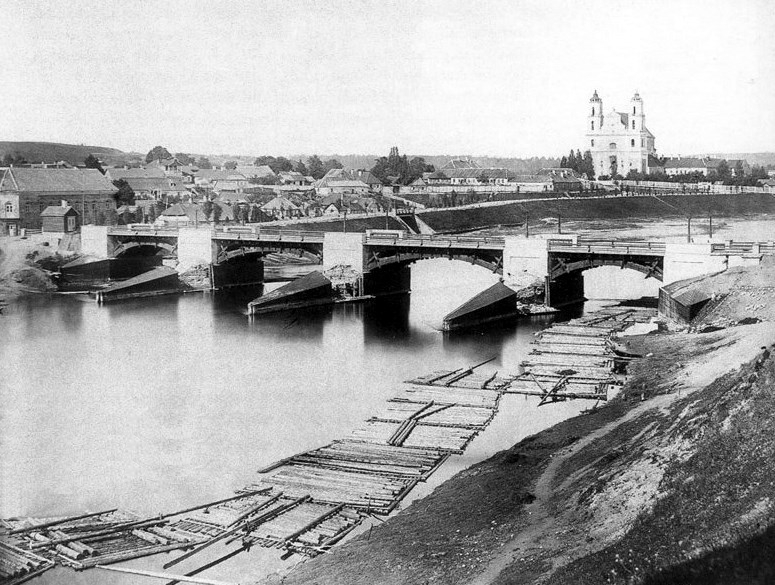
Bridge before 1890

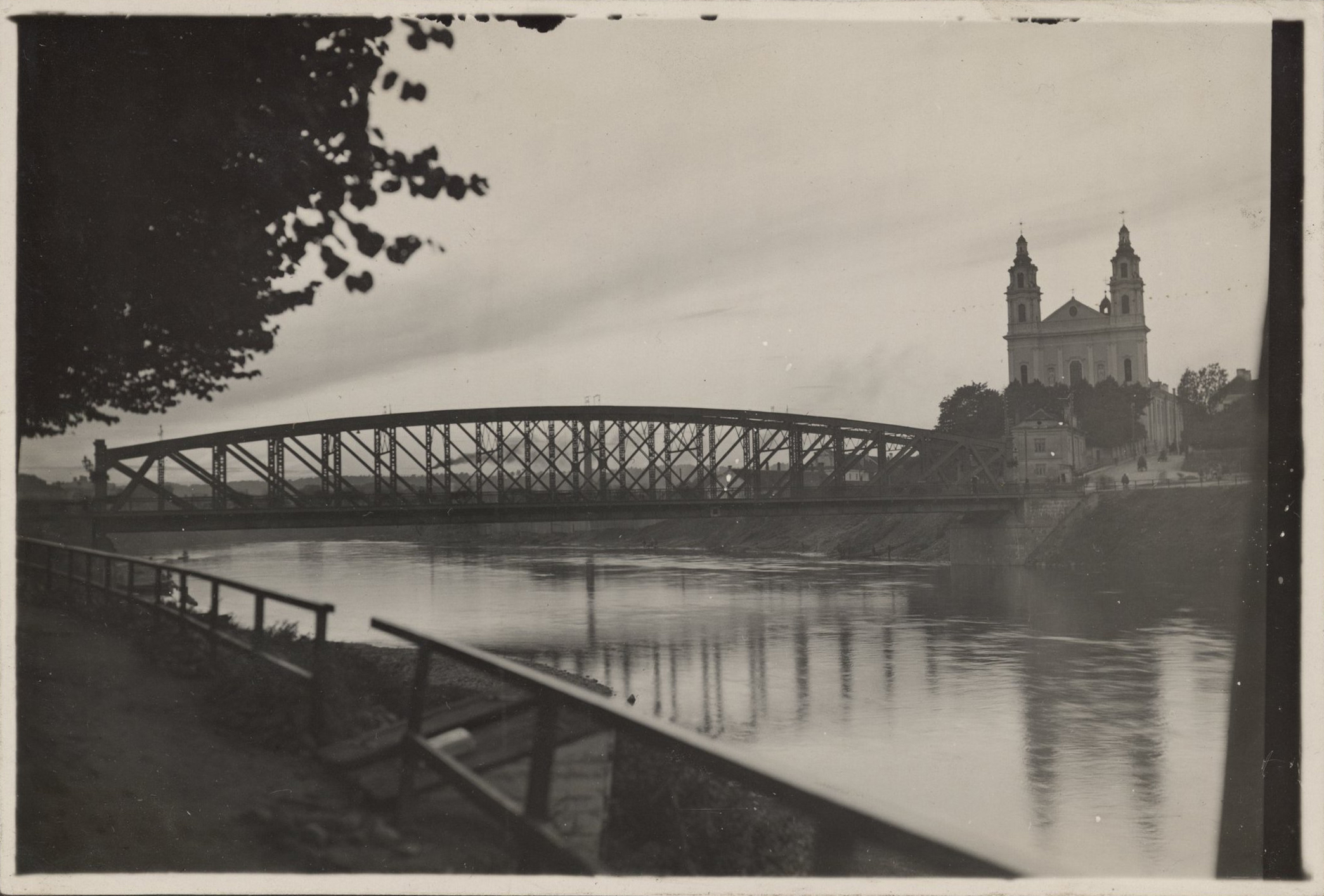
Bridge in 1929

== Soviet sculptures ==
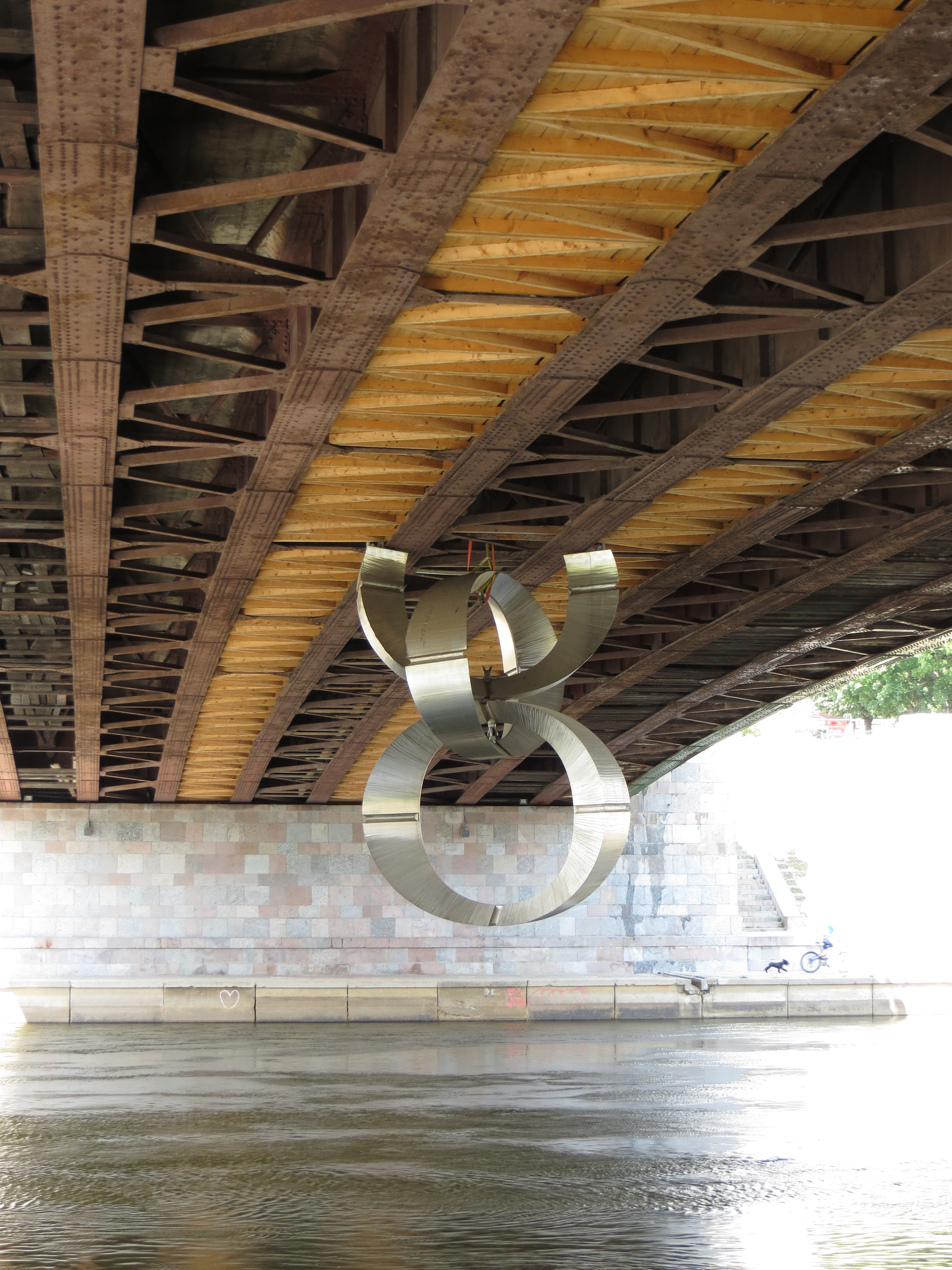
The Chain, by Kunotas Vildžiūnas, symbolizing the Soviet occupation; 2010

During the Soviet occupation, in 1952, the bridge was decorated with four sets of cast iron sculptures of Soviet realism – "Mokslo jaunimas" (Student Youth), "Taikos sargyboje" (Guarding Peace), "Žemės ūkis" (Agricultrure), "Pramonė ir statyba" (Industry and Construction). After the restoration of independence, the sculptures were a subject of heated public debate whether they represent a form of art or Soviet propaganda which should be removed.

The sculptures were deteriorating and often vandalized. In 2013, Artūras Zuokas, then mayor of Vilnius, announced a plan to refurbish the statues without removing them from the bridge, and to add a commemorative plaque about Soviet repressions below the sculptures as a compromise. However, in July 2015 the statues were removed, citing health and safety reasons. Later, Remigijus Šimašius announced that the decision to remove the sculptures is permanent. Various art installations have been placed on the bridge since.

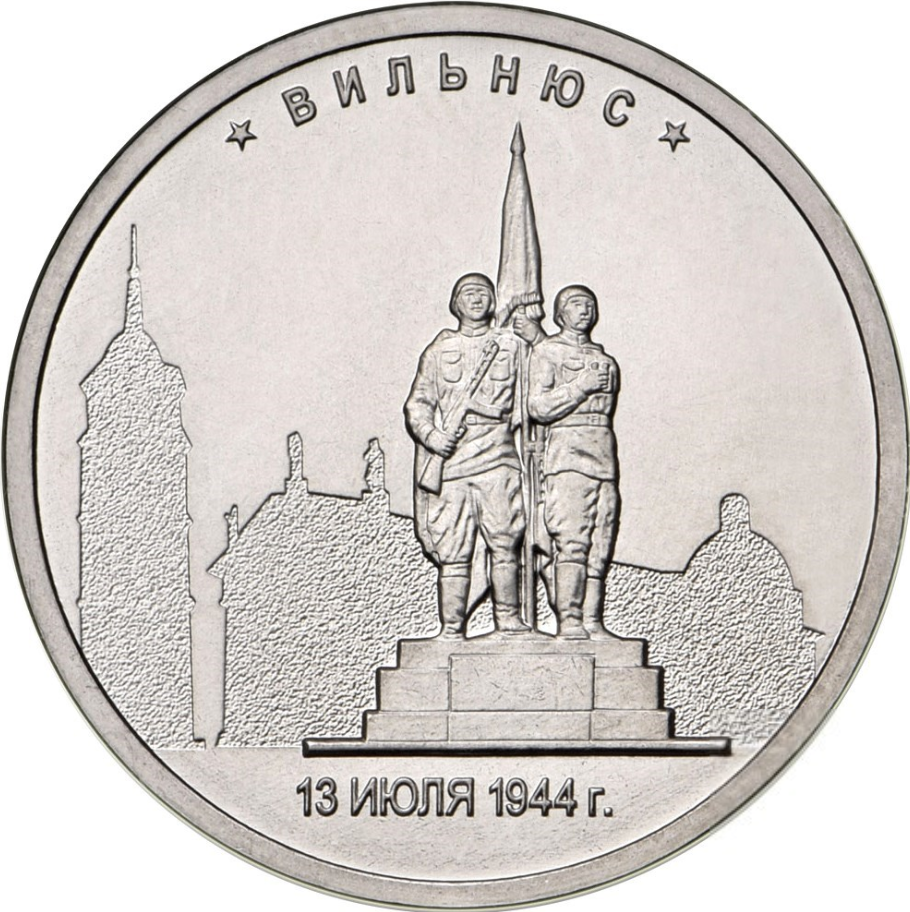
In 2016, a controversial Russian commemorative coin was issued featuring one of the removed Soviet sculptures.

In March 2016, the First Council of the Assessment of Immovable Cultural Heritage stripped the bridge and the statues of legal protection they enjoyed as artifacts of cultural value, making the restoration and return of the statues to the bridge unlikely. Members of the council expressed hope, however, that the statues would end up in a museum where they can be preserved and presented in the appropriate context.

In August 2016, a Lithuanian official sharply criticized a newly issued Russian commemorative coin depicting one of the removed statues – "Guarding Peace" – in connection with the Soviet retaking of Vilnius in 1944.

On 4 August 2023, renewal works started to repair stairways link with the bridge and remove graffiti from the sides of the bridge.
