= Bezdonys =

- Town
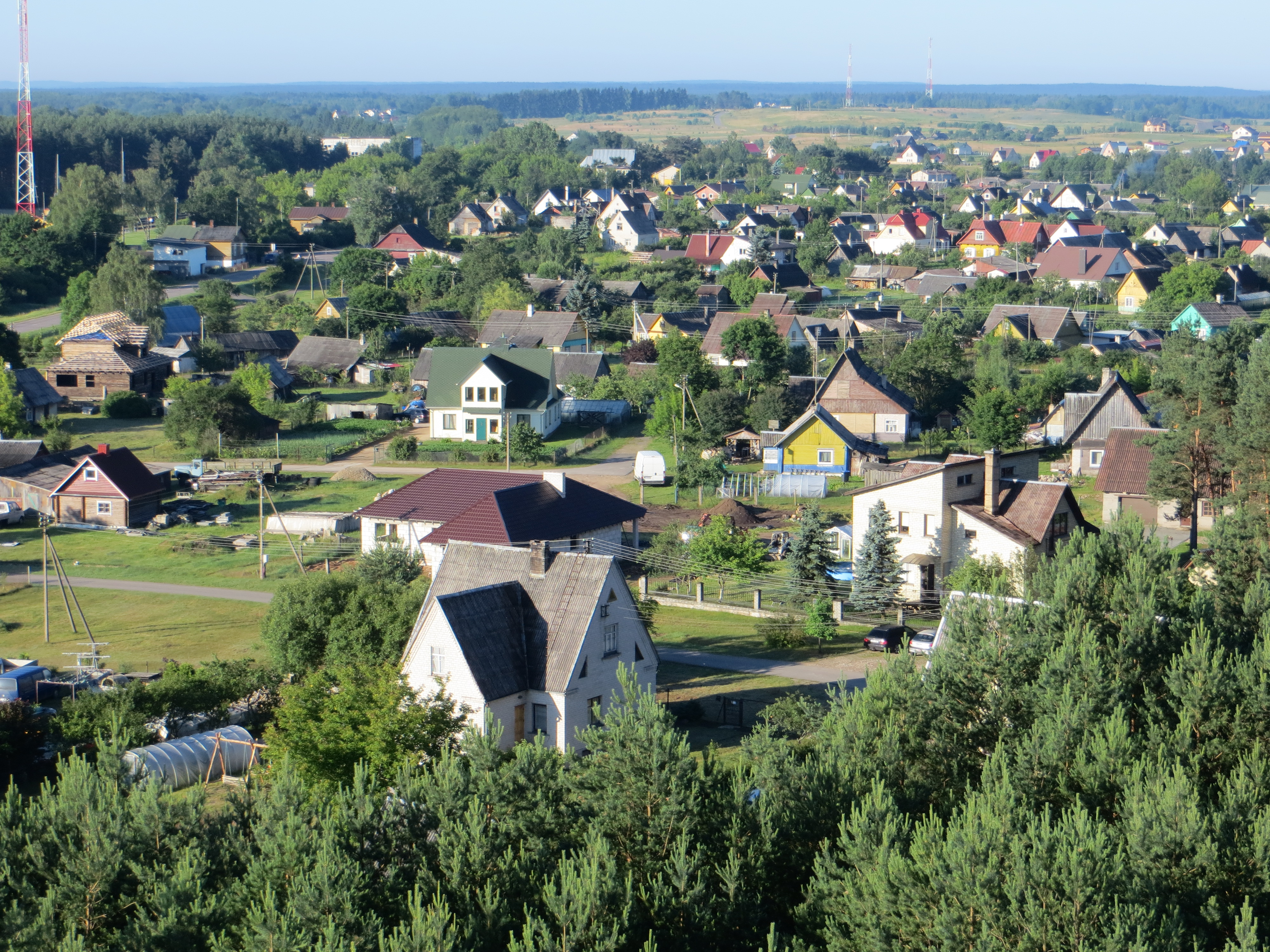
- Panoramic view of Bezdonys from the north

- Flag Coat of arms

- Location of Bezdonys
- Coordinates: 54°48′16″N 25°31′09″E
- Country: Lithuania
- County: Vilnius County
- Municipality: Vilnius district municipality
- Eldership: Bezdonys eldership
- Capital of: Bezdonys eldership

Population (2021)
  - Total: 636
- Time zone: UTC+2 (EET)
  - Summer (DST): UTC+3 (EEST)

Bezdonys is a town in Lithuania, located to the north of Vilnius, within the Vilnius district municipality. It is best known for the 1908 Bezdany raid, one of the most daring and successful train robberies in history. According to the Lithuanian census of 2011, the town had 743 inhabitants.

== History ==
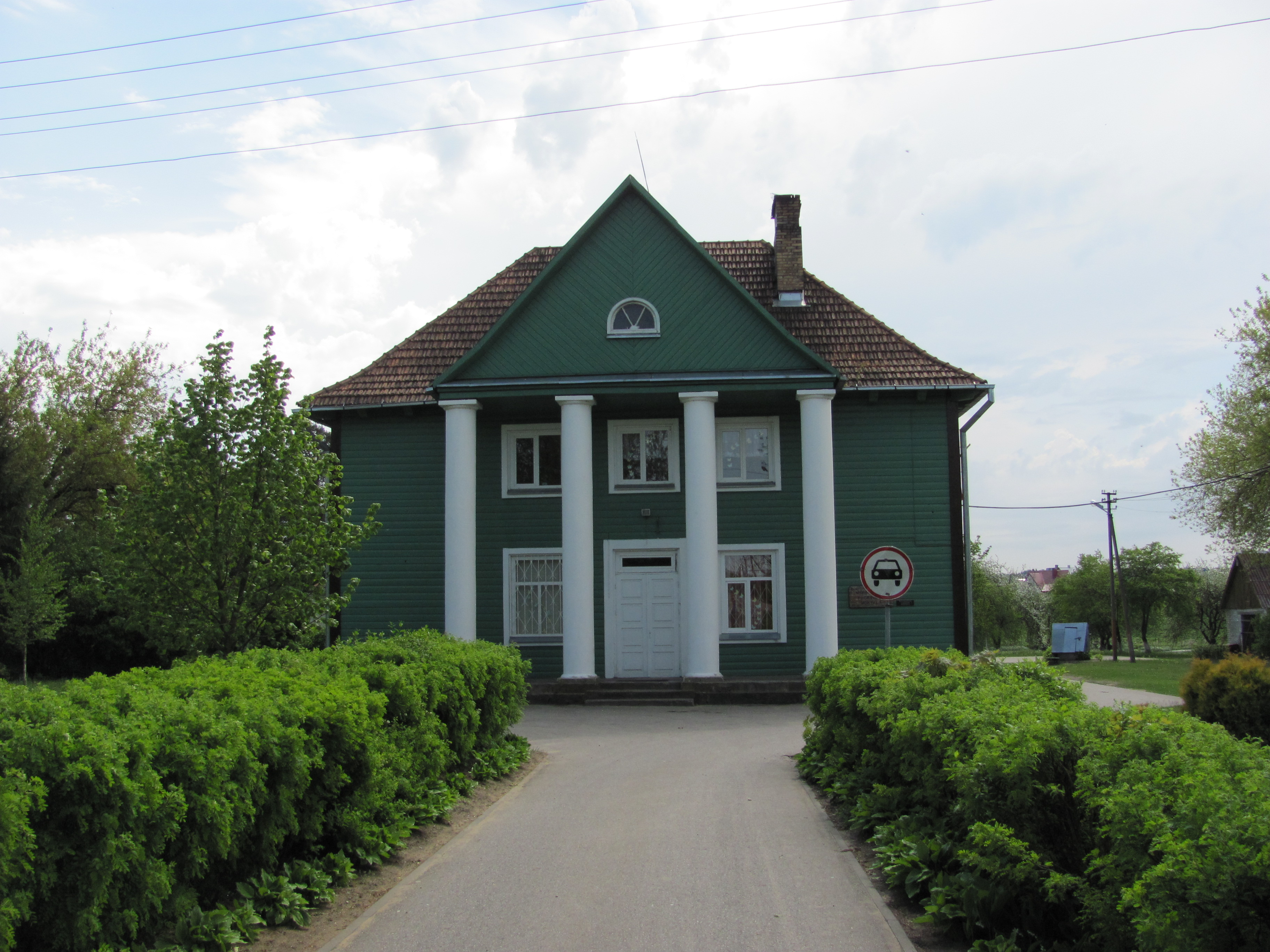
Bezdonys secondary school

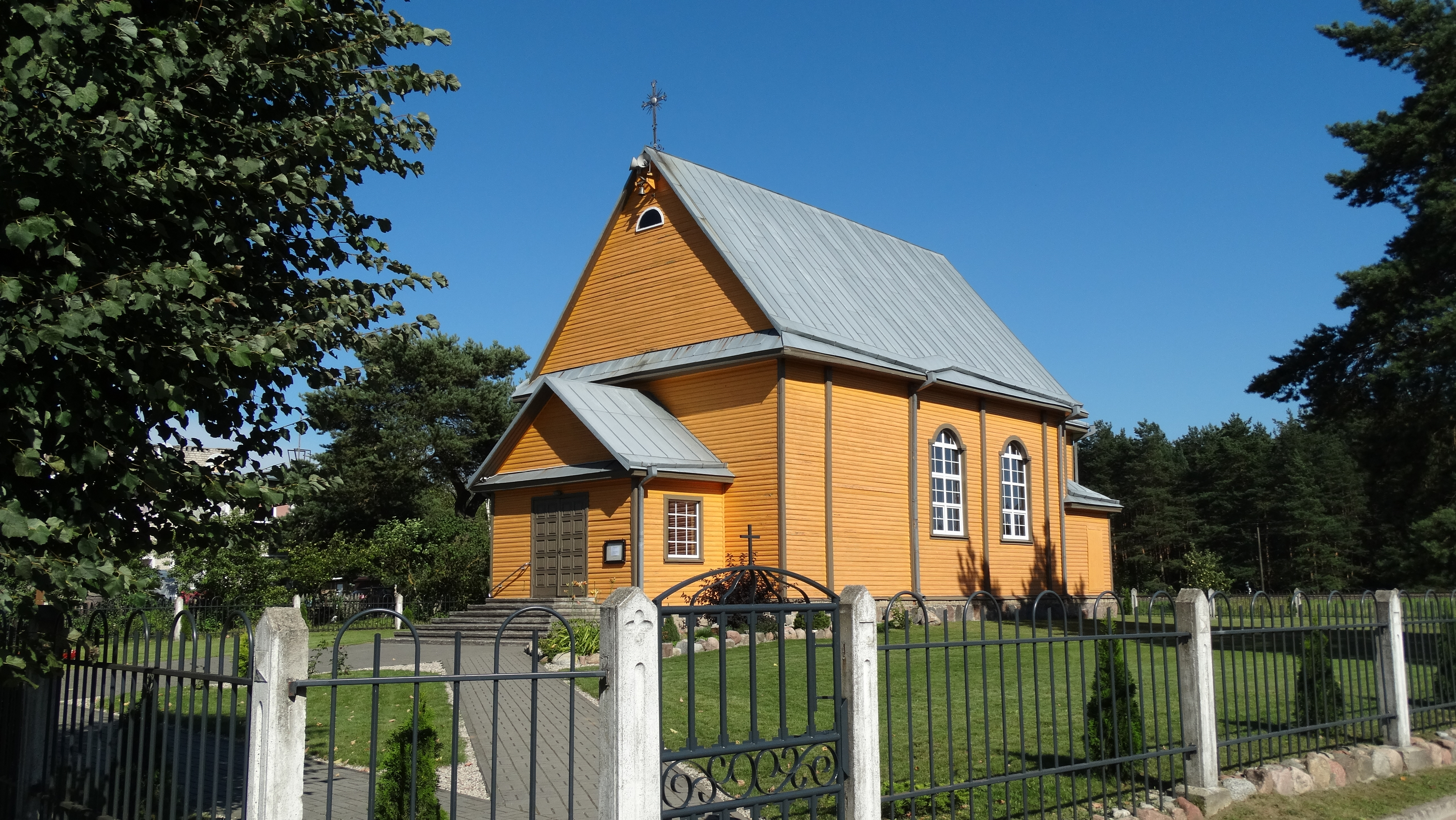
The Catholic church in Bezdonys, built in 1937

The site of the modern village has been inhabited at least since early Middle Ages. Local dense forests were a hunting resort of the Grand Dukes. Jan Długosz mentions, that the local hunting manor was visited by the Grand Duke of Lithuania Jogaila. In 1516 a hunting manor and surrounding land was granted by Grand Duke of Lithuania Sigismund I the Old to Ulrich Hosius, better known as father of Stanislaus Hosius. The area donated to the Hosius family consisted of roughly 7000 hectares of forests, with a single mill and three villages.

On 1 March 1605, Ulrich Hosius' great-grandson sold the village and the adjoining land for 5000 złoty to canon of Vilna Wilczopolski, who in turn donated it to the Jesuits in 1609. The village remained administered by the Jesuits until the suppression of the Society of Jesus in 1774. The area was taken over by the royal treasury, but already on July 12 of that year Grand Duke of Lithuania Stanislaus Augustus donated it to Mikołaj Łopaciński in exchange for a yearly donation for the Commission of National Education. (Note: Specifically Łopaciński and his heirs were to pay 4,5% of the value of the village, estimated at 72222 złoty 6 2/3 grosz) At that time the village had roughly 300 inhabitants, including roughly 20 noble families.

After the Partitions of Polish-Lithuanian Commonwealth the village remained in the hands of the Łopaciński family. The yearly fee however was instead paid to Saint Petersburg. Following the January Uprising the peasants living in Bezdany were granted with roughly 400 hectares (or desiatinas) of land. On March 15, 1862, the Warsaw – Saint Petersburg Railway was opened and one of its stations was located in Bezdany (or Безданы in Russian). It was there that the Bezdany raid of September 26, 1908 took place. A group of Polish revolutionaries led by Józef Piłsudski stole roughly 200,000 Russian rubles (Note: Roughly 100,000 contemporary US Dollars, or almost 10,000,000 in 2007 dollars (using the unskilled wage indicator of relative worth). See: measuringworth.com) from a passenger train. It is usually being said, that this sum was intended for the construction of an electric tram lines in Vilnius (Vilniaus arklinis tramvajus), that were never built in the aftermath.

After the Polish–Lithuanian War, the village for the first time appeared was under Polish rule. Marian Zyndram-Kościałkowski, the owner of the nearby village of Arvydai and future Prime Minister of Poland financed a new public school in Bezdany. Also, in 1937 a new wooden church was opened in the presence of the President of Poland Ignacy Mościcki. Until then, the nearest church was located in Nemenčinė, 8 kilometres away. By the end of the 1930s the village grew to almost 500 inhabitants and 70 houses.

On 9 July 1943, 350 local Jews are murdered in a forest nearby Bezdonys. The massacre was perpetrated by an einsatzgruppen of Germans and local collaborationists led by Bruno Kittel.

Following World War II the village was returned to Lithuania. Roughly half of pre-war inhabitants were evicted and expelled to within post-war Poland.

In the late 1930s in order to ostensibly honor late Józef Piłsudski, a hundred public schools, named after him, were built in the Vilnius region to polonise the locals, while Lithuanian schools were simultaneously closed down – one such wooden Polish school was built in Bezdonys too. In 1946 a Russian language class was added to the Polish language school and in 1957 also Lithuanian language class was opened. In 1968 a new school building was opened and in 1992 a new Lithuanian language only school was built.

== Demographics ==
According to the 2021 census, out of 2790 inhabitants of Bezdonys Eldership:

- Lithuanians - 1416 (50.75%)
- Poles - 1008 (36.1%)
- Russians - 196 (7.1%)
- Belarusians - 81 (2.9%)
