= Vokiečių Street =

Street in Vilnius, Lithuania

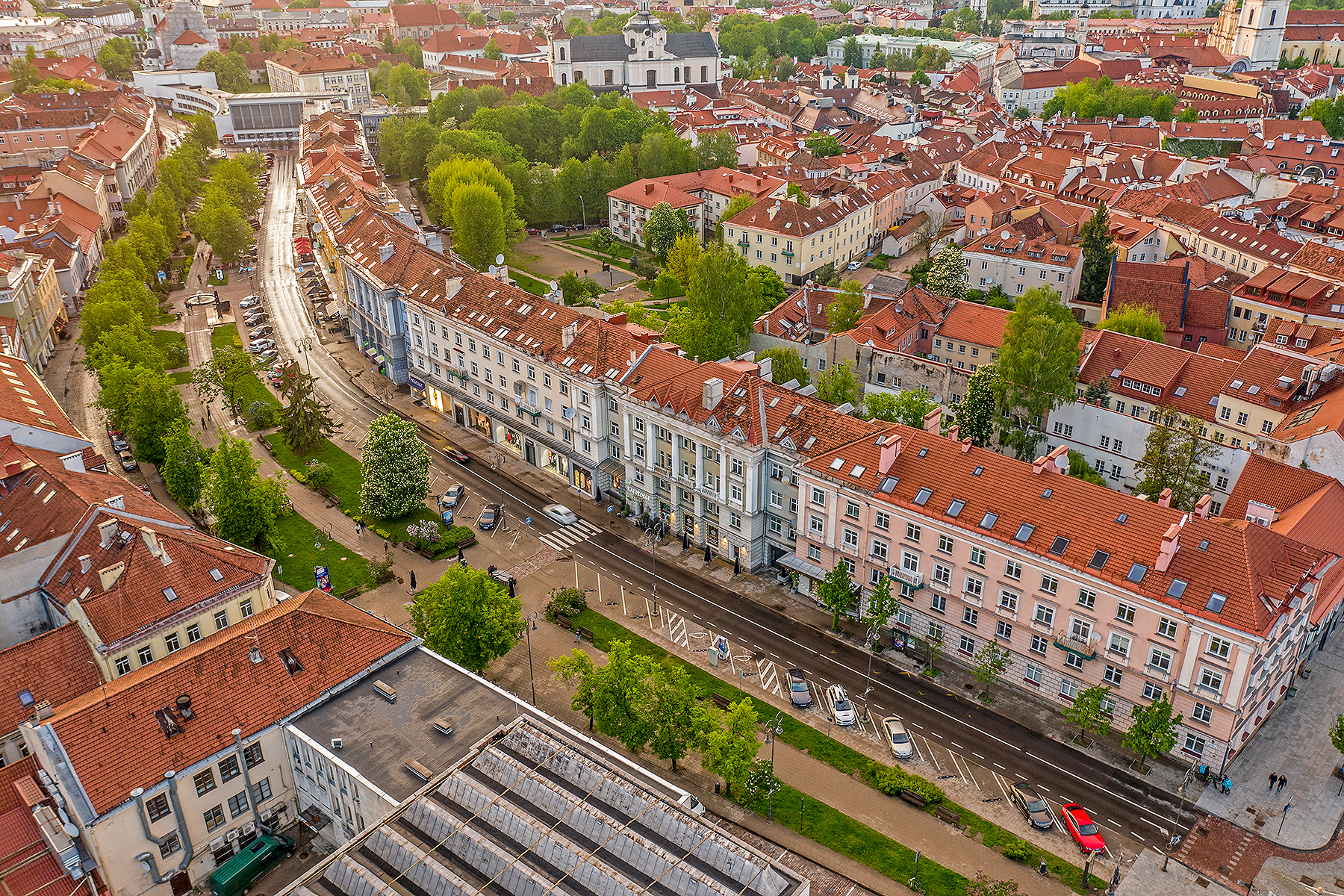
- Vokiečių Street in summer
- Interactive map of Vokiečių Street
- Native name: Vokiečių gatvė (Lithuanian)
- Former name(s): Die Deutsche gasse, Gasztoldowska, Monetowa, Niemiecka, Немецкая
- Length: 360 m (1,180 ft)
- Location: Vilnius, Lithuania
- Postal code: LT-01013, LT-01130
- Coordinates: 54°40′45″N 25°17′2″E

Vokiečių Street (literally: the German Street; Lithuanian: Vokiečių gatvė; German: Die Deutsche Gasse) is a street in the Old Town of Vilnius, the capital of Lithuania. It is one of the oldest streets in Vilnius and its name arise from the 14th century when the German merchants and craftsman settled there. From 1546, the Vilnius Mint was located in the street. The street was the most beautiful in Vilnius in the 16th century as it already had many brick houses. In the second half of the 19th century, the street was densely inhabited by the Jews and the Great Synagogue of Vilna was located in Vokiečių Street 13A.

Following the World War II, the old structure of the street was severely destroyed as many damaged buildings were demolished and the original buildings survived only on one side of the street.
