= Hozyusz coat of arms =

Polish coat of arms

Hozyusz
- Alternative names: Hosius, Hosz, Pończocha
- Earliest mention: 1549/1561
- Towns: none
- Families: Bezdan, Butt-Hussaim, Guszcza, Gut, Gutt, Horbacewicz, Horbaczewski, Hosz, Hoziusz - Hozjusz - Hozyusz, Husain, Huszcza, Kmieciński.

Hozyusz is a Polish coat of arms. It was used by several szlachta families.

== Notable bearers ==
Notable bearers of this coat of arms include:

- Stanisław Hozjusz
- Stanisław Józef Hozjusz

== See also ==
- Polish heraldry
- Heraldic family
- List of Polish nobility coats of arms
- Coat of Arms of Pope Pius IV

== Bibliography ==
- Tadeusz Gajl: Herbarz polski od średniowiecza do XX wieku : ponad 4500 herbów szlacheckich 37 tysięcy nazwisk 55 tysięcy rodów. L&L, 2007. ISBN 978-83-60597-10-1.
- Józef Szymański: Herbarz rycerstwa polskiego z XVI wieku. Warszawa: DiG, 2001, s. 96. ISBN 83-7181-217-5.
- Juliusz Karol Ostrowski: Księga herbowa rodów polskich. T. 2. Warszawa: Główny skład księgarnia antykwarska B. Bolcewicza, 1897, s. 109.
