= Ulrich Hosius =

Ulrich Hosius (German: Ulrich Hosse; Polish: Ulryk Hozjusz; c. 1455–1535 in Vilnius) was a Polish-Lithuanian townsman of German descent, horodniczy of Vilnius. He is known for supervising several large construction projects in Vilnius. His son Stanislaus Hosius rose to the ranks of a Catholic bishop, cardinal and Papal legate.

== Biography ==
=== Royal mint ===
Hosius was born in Pforzheim. His brother served at the court of the Margraviate of Baden. Hosius married in Kraków Anna, a widow of Kraków merchant Erhard Slacker in 1500. He became citizen of Kraków in 1503. Together with his relatives by marriage, Henryk Slacker and Henryk Karłowicz, he supplied silver to the mint. He purchased two houses in Kraków. In 1504, together with his business partners, he left for Lithuania, where he became the customs collector in Kaunas and soon afterwards took over the management of the Vilnius Mint. Hosius directed Vilnius Mint, but it was closed by the Grand Duke Sigismund I the Old in 1506. Due to protests by Lithuanian nobles, the mint was reopened in 1508. He continued to direct the mint until its closure in 1529. This work allowed Hosius to accumulate a large personal fortune and he build his residence on the present-day Vokiečių Street.

=== Construction projects ===
In 1513, Hosius was appointed as a supervisor (aedilis) of the reconstruction of the Lower Castle by Sigismund I the Old. From 1515, Hosius supervised the construction of royal mills in the Grand Duchy; a third of the mills' revenue belonged to Hosius. Hosius supervised the construction of the first water-supply system of Vilnius. He also constructed the Green Bridge (1532–1534), one of the first permanent bridges across the Neris River. It was a wooden bridge on brick footing and had checkpoints to collect tolls. In 1535, Hosius started the construction of a hospital attached to the Dominican Church of the Holy Spirit, which was finished by his son Jan in 1570.

=== Other positions ===
It is likely that Hosius was treasurer of Michael Glinski (mentioned in written sources in 1509). Hosius was the castellan of Vilnius (chief administrator of the Vilnius Castle) from 1518 to his death in 1535. In 1528, he became Standard-bearer of Vilnius.

== Wealth ==
For loyal service, Sigismund I the Old gifted him the village of Bezdonys in 1516. He also owned three houses in Vilnius, two houses in Kraków, and revenue streams from royal mills and tolls from the Green Bridge. By his first wife, Anna, Ulrich had a daughter, Anna, and two sons: Jan, who served as horodniczy of Vilnius, and Stanisław, who became a cardinal. By his second wife, Brygida Glaywicz, a burgher woman from Kraków, he had a son, Ulryk, who became customs collector in Kaunas, and two daughters, Brygida and Barbara.
