= Vilnius Mint =

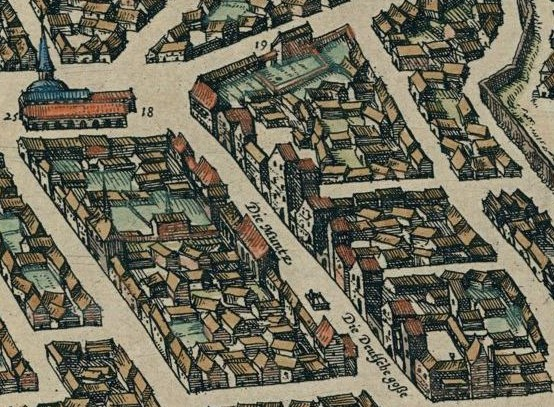
- Vokiečių Street, as depicted in 1576, where the Vilnius Mint was located from 1546
- Type: Coin mint
- Industry: Coin production
- Founded: 1387; 639 years ago
- Defunct: 1666
- Headquarters: Vilnius, Grand Duchy of Lithuania
- Area served: Grand Duchy of Lithuania
- Products: Coins
- Owner: Grand Duke of Lithuania

The Vilnius Mint (Lithuanian: Vilniaus monetų kalykla) was the main mint of the Grand Duchy of Lithuania which produced coins in Vilnius from 1387 to 1666 (with breaks). Many of the coins minted in the Vilnius Mint had privy marks of the Grand Treasurer of Lithuania (coat of arms and initials).

== History ==
The mints of gold and copper operated separately. In 1546, the mint was located on the present-day Vokiečių Street. Later, in the grounds of Vilnius Lower Castle there were gold and, in the second half of the 17th century, copper mints. The mint was managed by a governor, who was assisted by a clerk (he took care of the acquisition, issuance, and accounting, and checked the quality of coins). Other positions in the mint were: a money craftsman (he was responsible for the production of coins), an assayer, a stamp engraver, a bleacher, and money struckers.

The rent of the mint was practiced since the time of Grand Duke Stephen Báthory. Initially, it depended on the number of coins minted, but from the time of Grand Duke Sigismund III Vasa an additional amount of determined sum of money was paid (700-800 gold coins; the amount increased if the mint was leased).

The Vilnius Mint was closed in 1666, and no further coins were minted in the Lithuanian territory of the Polish-Lithuanian Commonwealth after the closure of the mint in Kaunas.

== See also ==
- Kaunas Mint (Grand Duchy of Lithuania)
