= Boratynka =

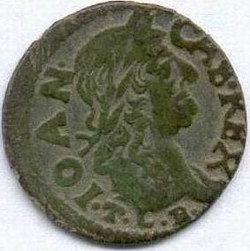
Crown boratynka (obverse)

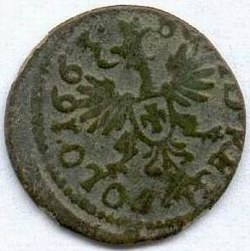
Crown boratynka (reverse)

Boratynka (boratynek) is a popular, unofficial name of a copper szeląg (shilling), minted in the Polish–Lithuanian Commonwealth in 1659–1668, during the reign of John II Casimir. Coin weighing 1-1,2 g, was minted by Tito Livio Burattini. The name appeared in Polish numismatic literature in the second half of 19th century.

Boratynki were made both in Poland and in the Grand Duchy of Lithuania. Polish boratynki were minted in Kraków and Ujazdów, while Lithuanian boratynki were minted in Vilnius, Kaunas and Malbork.
