= Stanislaus Hosius =

Polish cardinal

Servant of God Stanislaus Hosius
- Prince-Bishop of Warmia
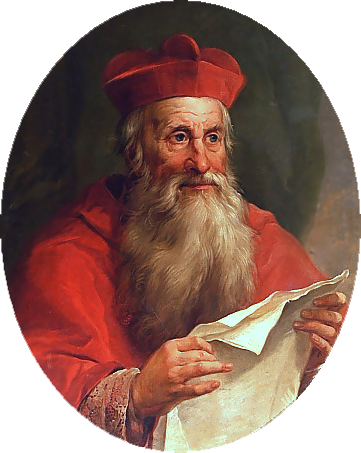
- Portrait by Marcello Bacciarelli
- Archdiocese: Bishopric of Warmia
- Appointed: 2 March 1551
- Installed: 11 May 1551
- Term ended: 5 August 1579
- Predecessor: Tiedemann Giese
- Successor: Marcin Kromer
- Other posts: Cardinal-Priest of Santa Maria Trastevere (1578–1579); Major Penitentiary of the Apostolic Penitentiary (1574–1579)
- Previous posts: Bishop of Chełmno (1549–1551); Apostolic Nuncio to Austria-Hungary (1560–1561); Cardinal-Priest of San Lorenzo in Panisperna (1561–1562); Cardinal-Priest of San Pancrazio (1562–1565); Cardinal-Priest of Santa Sabina (1565); Cardinal-Priest of San Teodoro (1565–1570); Cardinal-Priest of Santa Prisca (1570); Cardinal-Priest of Santa Anastasia (1570); Cardinal-Priest of San Clemente (1570–1578); Cardinal-Priest of San Pietro in Vincoli (1578)

Orders
- Ordination: 1543
- Consecration: 23 March 1550
- Created cardinal: 26 February 1561 by Pius IV
- Rank: Cardinal-Priest

Personal details
- Born: Stanisław Hozjusz; 5 May 1504 Kraków, Kingdom of Poland
- Died: 5 August 1579 (aged 75) Capranica Prenestina, Papal States
- Denomination: Roman Catholic
- Parents: Ulrich Hosse of Pforzheim
- Education: University of Padua; University of Bologna
- Coat of arms: Stanislaus Hosius's coat of arms

Ordination history of Stanislaus Hosius
History
Cardinalate
- Date: 26 February 1561

Stanislaus Hosius (Polish: Stanisław Hozjusz; 5 May 1504 – 5 August 1579) was a Polish Roman Catholic cardinal. From 1551 he was the Prince-Bishop of the Bishopric of Warmia in Royal Prussia, and from 1558, he served as the papal legate to the Holy Roman Emperor's Imperial Court in Vienna, Austria. From 1566 he was also the papal legate to Poland.

== Early life ==
Hosius was born in Kraków, the son of Ulrich Hosse of Pforzheim. He spent his early youth at Kraków and Vilnius, and at the age of fifteen, already well versed in German, Polish and Latin, he entered the University of Kraków from which he graduated as Bachelor of Arts in 1520. Piotr Tomicki, Bishop of Kraków and Vice-Chancellor of Poland, employed him as private secretary and entrusted to him the education of his nephews. Tomicki became his patron and underwrote his studies at the University of Padua and the University of Bologna, Italy. At Padua, Reginald Pole was one of his fellow students. At Bologna, he pursued jurisprudence under Hugo Buoncompagni, the future Gregory XIII.

== Career ==
After graduating as doctor of canon and civil law at the University of Bologna on 8 June 1534, he returned to Krakow and became secretary in the royal chancery. On the death of Bishop Tomicki (1535), he continued as secretary under the new vice-chancellor, Bishop Jan Chojeński of Płock. After the death of Bishop Choinski in 1538, Hosius was appointed royal secretary. In that position, he had the entire confidence of King Sigismund, who bestowed various ecclesiastical benefices upon him as reward for his faithful services. In 1543, Hosius was ordained priest. King Sigismund died in 1548, but before his death, he had instructed his son and successor, Sigismund II, to nominate Hosius for the next vacant episcopal see.

Hosius was nominated for the See of Chełmno in 1549. He had not sought that dignity and accepted it only with reluctance. Hosius was then sent by Sigismund on a diplomatic important mission to the courts of King Ferdinand I at Prague and Emperor Charles V at Brussels and Ghent. The mission resulted in an alliance between Poland and the other monarchies. Upon his return to Poland, he received episcopal consecration at Kraków on 23 March 1550, and he immediately took possession of his see. Hosius had Jesuit sympathies and actively opposed the Protestant Reformation.

Two years later, he became Prince-Bishop of Warmia in Royal Prussia, Poland. Hosius drew up the Confessio fidei christiana catholica, adopted by the Synod of Piotrków in 1557. He was a supremely-skillful diplomat and administrator. Hosius and Marcin Kromer were the two bishops most instrumental in keeping the Warmia region Catholic, and neighbouring Ducal Prussia became Protestant. In 1558 Pope Paul IV summoned him to Rome, and soon Hosius became an influential member of the Roman Curia.

The following year, Pope Pius IV appointed Hosius as his personal nuncio to Ferdinand I, Holy Roman Emperor, at the court in Vienna, where he was to work on the reopening of the Council of Trent. He was further charged with gaining the support of the emperor's son, Maximilian, who appeared to have Protestant sympathies. For his successful work Hosius was promoted to cardinal in 1561. Pope Pius IV named him Legate-Theologian for the third session of the Council of Trent; the other two legates were Cardinals Puteo and Gonzaga.

Despite health issues he mediated between the various factions at the Council and addressed issues particular to Poland-Lithuania, such as the status of the Teutonic Knights and the marriage of Stanislaus Orzechowski. When the Council ended, he returned home, despite requests to travel to Rome for the papal conclave that was to be held after the death of the ailing Pius IV. Cardinal Truchess even suggested that Hosius was a candidate for the papacy. Instead of going to Rome, he returned to his diocese, leaving Trent on December 1563 to implement the decrees and canons of the Council of Trent. In 1566, Pope Pius V consecrated him as Papal Legate to Poland.

== Death and legacy ==
Besides carrying through many difficult negotiations, he founded the lyceum of Braunsberg to counter the rapidly spreading Protestants. It became the centre of the Roman Catholic mission among Protestants. In 1572, Pope Gregory XIII declared Hosius a member of the Congregatio Germania. He died at Capranica Prenestina, near Rome, on 5 August 1579.

A special friend to Hosius was Saint Peter Canisius. Both Kromer and Hosius left many records of their German speeches and sermons in their years of duty in the Bishopric of Warmia. They were later translated to Czech, English, and French.

A collected edition of his works was published at Cologne, Germany, in 1584. A two-volume biography was written by A. Eichhorn (Mainz, 1854).

== Cause of beatification ==
The cause of sainthood commenced but paused for a while until it resumed as of 5 August 2006. He is now known as a Servant of God.

== See also ==
- Theatre of the Virtues of the Venerable Stanislaus Hosius – a collection of 105 drawings by the engraver Tomasz Treter, depicting the life of Hosius

== Secondary literature ==
- Theodor Hirsch (1881). "Hosius, Stanislaus". Allgemeine Deutsche Biographie (in German). Vol. 13. Leipzig: Duncker & Humblot. pp. 180–184.
- Hubert Jedin (1972). "Hosius, Stanislaus". Neue Deutsche Biographie (in German). Vol. 9. Berlin: Duncker & Humblot. pp. 650–651.
- Theologische Realenzyklopädie (TRE), Bd. 15, S. 598-600
- Benrath: Realenzyklopädie für protestantische Theologie und Kirche (RE) 3. Auflage Bd. 8 S. 382-392
- Heinz Scheible: Melanchthons Briefwechsel Personen 12 Stuttgart-Bad Cannstatt, Germany, 2005 ISBN 3-7728-2258-4
- Lexikon für Theologie und Kirche (LThK) 3. Auflage Bd. 5 S. 284
- Arno Sames: Religion in Geschichte und Gegenwart (RGG) 4 Auflage, Bd. 3, S. 1912
- Stanislao Rescio (Reszka), D. Stanislai Hosii Vita, in Acta Historica Res Gestas Poloniae illustrantia, tom. IV (ed. by F. Hipler and V. Zakrzewski) (Cracow, 1879), I-CXXIV.

=== Literature in English ===
- Henry Damien Wojtyska, C.P., Cardinal Hosius: Legate to the Council of Trent (Rome: Institute of Ecclesiastical Studies, 1967).
  - A review of the above, with some brief information on Hosius himself: Sebastian A. Matczak, The Polish Review, vol. 18, no. 3 (1973), pp. 93–95, JSTOR.
- Michael Ott, O.S.B., "Stanislaus Hosius," Catholic Encyclopedia (New York: Robert Appleton, 1910), vol. 7, New Advent.

== Sources ==
- Wojtyska, Henryk Damian. Cardinal Hosius Legate to the Council of Trent Studia Ecclesiastica, 3 Historica, 4 Dissertationes, 5. Rome,: Institute of ecclesiastical studies, 1967.
- Stanislaus Hosius in the German National Library catalogue
- "Stanislaus Hosius". Biographisch-Bibliographisches Kirchenlexikon (BBKL) (in German).
- Stanislai Hosii (...) Opera omnia in duos divisa tomos, quorum primus ab (...) auctore (...) auctus et recognitus (...) secundus autem totus novus, nuncque primum typis excusus (...)
- Stanislai Hosii (...) Opera omnia (...) nunc novissime ab ipso auctore (...) recognita (...) cura (...) Henrici Dunghaei (...) edita (...)
- Ersch / Gruber: Allgemeine Encyclopädie der Wissenschaften und Künste VOLUME Sect. 2 T. 11 S. 93
- "Entry". Zedlers Universallexikon. Vol. 13. p. 504.
- Four cities of Germany

Catholic Church titles
Regnal titles
Preceded by Tiedemann Giese	Prince-Bishop of Warmia (Ermland); 1551–1579	Succeeded by Marcin Kromer
Records
Preceded by Scipione Rebiba	Oldest living Member of the Sacred College; 23 July 1577 - 5 August 1579	Succeeded by René de Birague
