= Iron Wolf Bridge =

Bridge in Vilnius, Lithuania

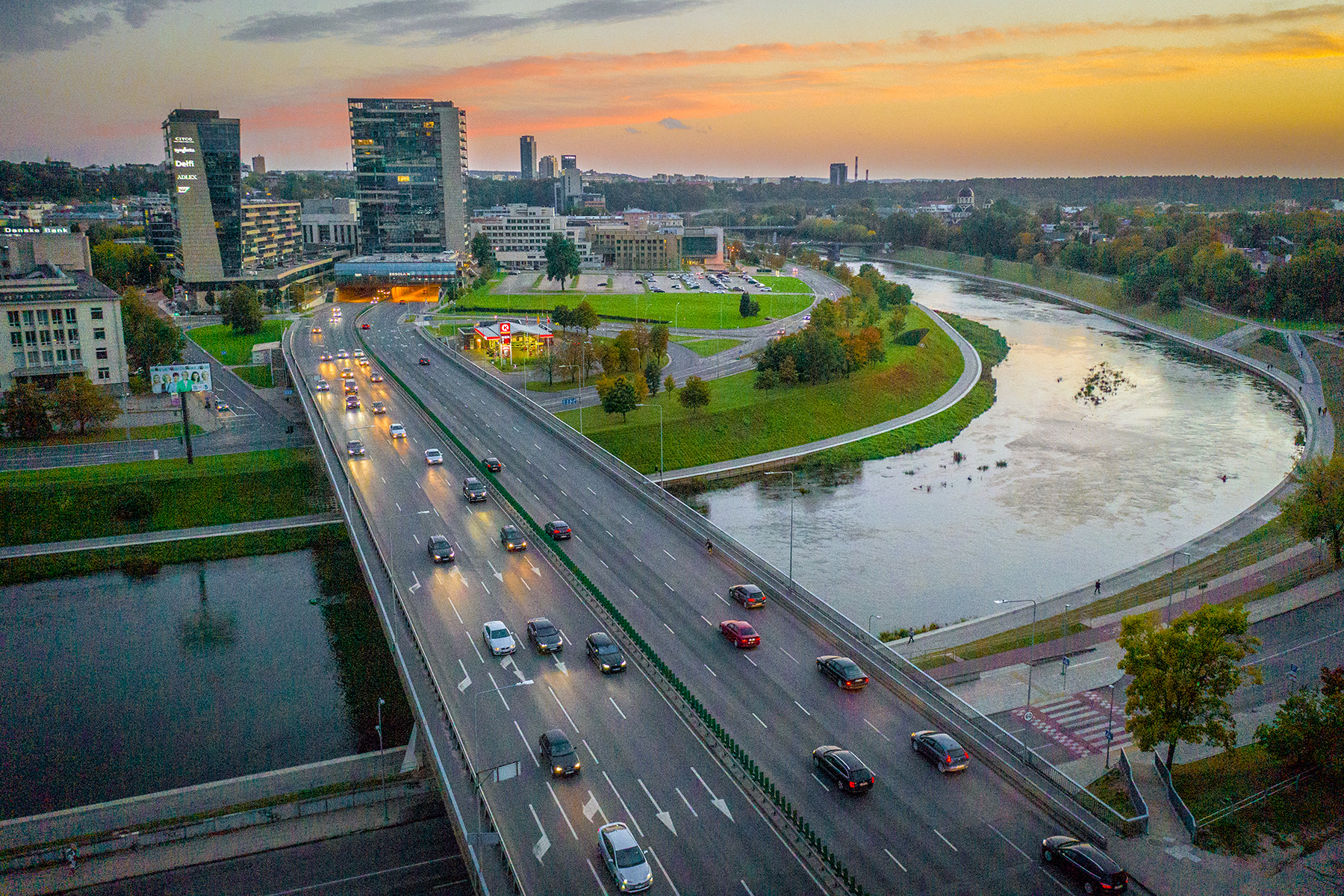
- Coordinates: 54°41′43″N 25°15′50″E
- Crosses: Neris River
- Locale: Vilnius
- Preceded by: White Bridge
- Followed by: Žvėrynas Bridge

Characteristics
- Total length: 207 metres (679 ft)
- Width: 37 metres (121 ft)
- Height: 12 metres (39 ft)

History
- Opened: 1979

The Iron Wolf Bridge (Lithuanian: Geležinio vilko tiltas) is a bridge over the Neris River in Vilnius, Lithuania. Named after the legend of Iron Wolf, the bridge connects Naujamiestis with the districts of Žvėrynas and Šnipiškės, as the roundabout is situated at the administrative line.

== Operation ==
The bridge has four lanes for each way and is the widest bridge in Vilnius. It one of the busiest and most important transport arteries in Vilnius, leading to the A1 highway in the south and A2 as well as A14 highways in the north. The bridge is located close to the Parliament of Lithuania.

== History ==
The bridge was constructed in 1979 and is made of reinforced concrete.

In February 2022, in protest to the 2022 Russian invasion of Ukraine, Lithuanian graffiti artists produced a painting on the bridge featuring the "Russian warship, go fuck yourself" slogan.
