= Vilnius Kenesa =

Karaite synagogue in Vilnius, Lithuania

- Lithuanian: Vilniaus kenesa
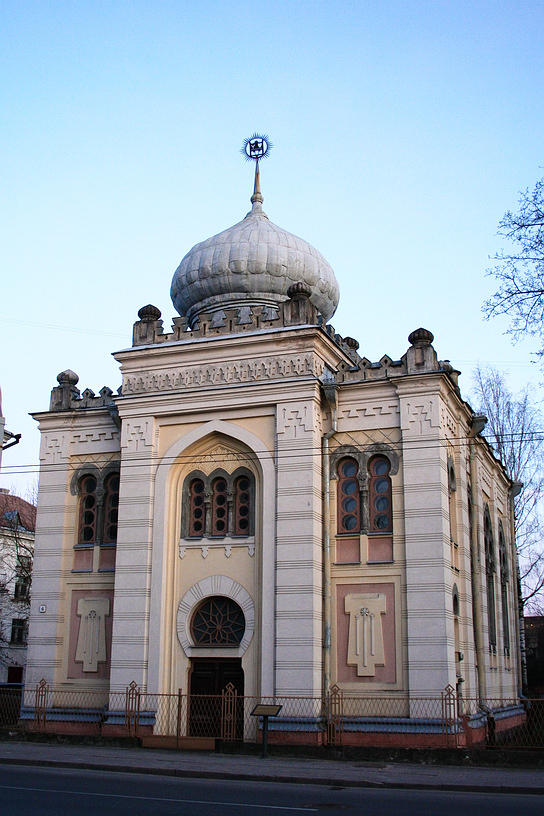
- The façade of the kenesa, in 2007

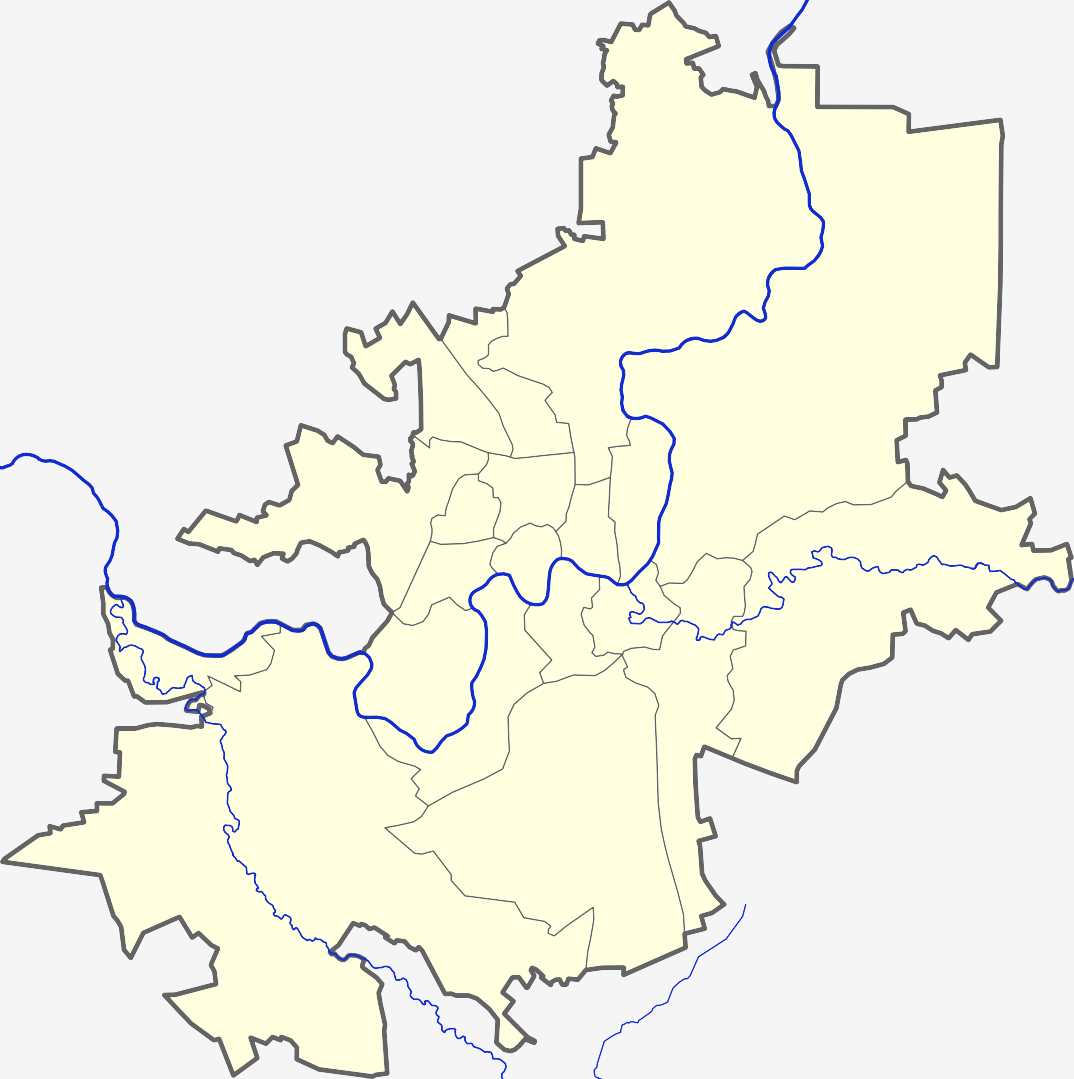
- Location of the kenesa in Vilnius

Religion
- Affiliation: Judaism
- Rite: Karaite Judaism
- Ecclesiastical or organizational status: Kenesa (1923–1941); Profane use (1949–1988); Kenesa (since 1993)
- Year consecrated: 1923
- Status: Active

Location
- Location: 6 Liubarto Street, Vilnius, Žvėrynas, Vilnius County
- Country: Lithuania
- Interactive map of Vilnius Kenesa
- Coordinates: 54°41′19″N 25°15′20″E

Architecture
- Architect: Mikhail Prozorov
- Type: Synagogue architecture
- Style: Historicist; Moorish Revival
- Groundbreaking: 1908
- Completed: 1923

Specifications
- Dome: One
- Materials: Brick

The Vilnius Kenesa (Lithuanian: Vilniaus kenesa) is a Qaraite Jewish congregation and synagogue, or kenesa, located at 6 Liubarto Street, in Žvėrynas, one of the neighborhoods of Vilnius, in the Vilnius County of Lithuania.

== History ==
Designed by Mikhail Prozorov in the Historicist and Moorish Revival styles, the synagogue was completed in 1923. Its windows have a Moorish Revival–style decor on the exterior.

In 1949 the Kenesa was nationalized and a club, an archive and flats were established in it. On 23 September 1988 the Kenesa was returned to the Karaites community. In 1989–1993 the Kenesa was reconstructed and original interior plan with its decor elements were restored.

== Gallery ==
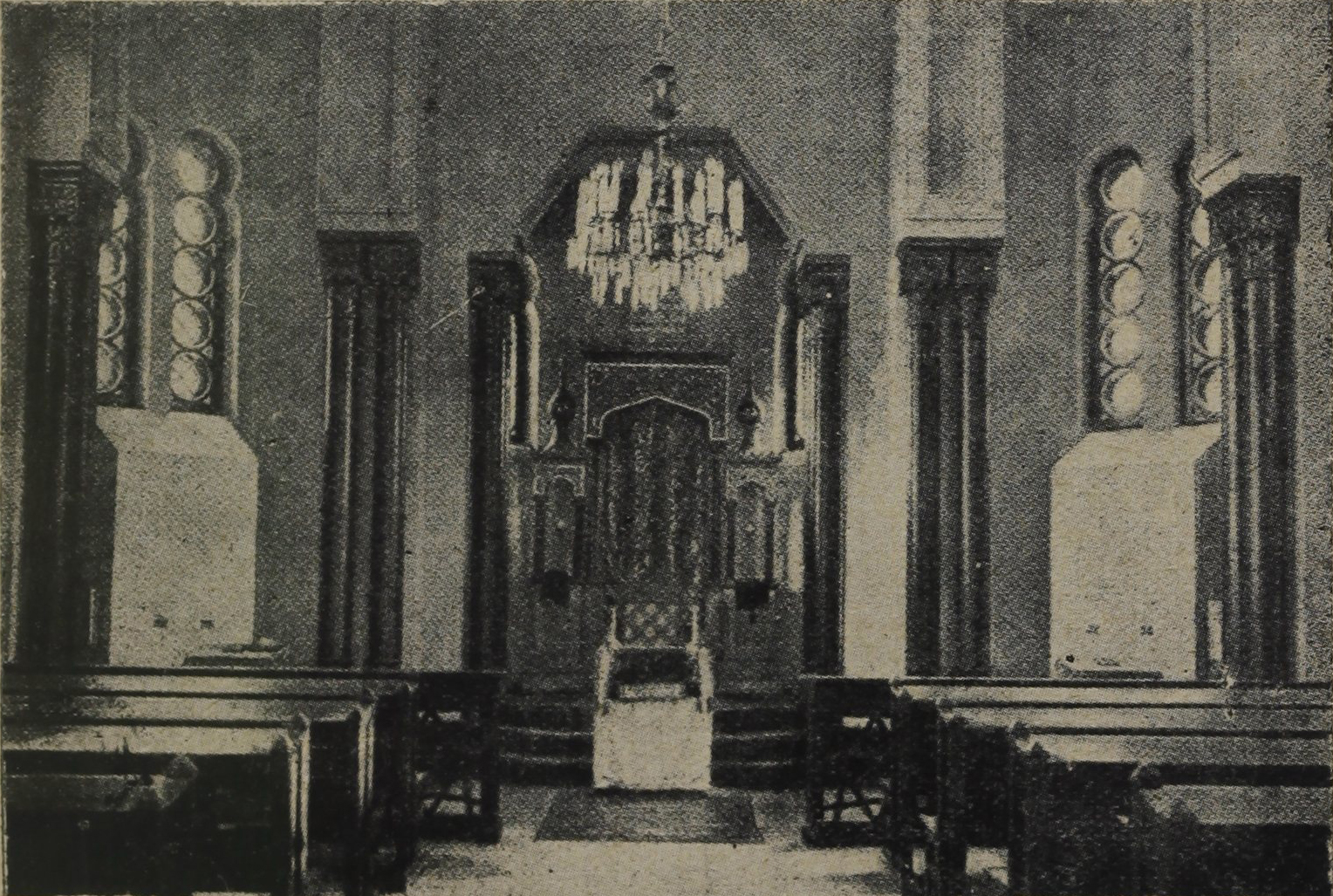
Interior of the Kenesa in 1927

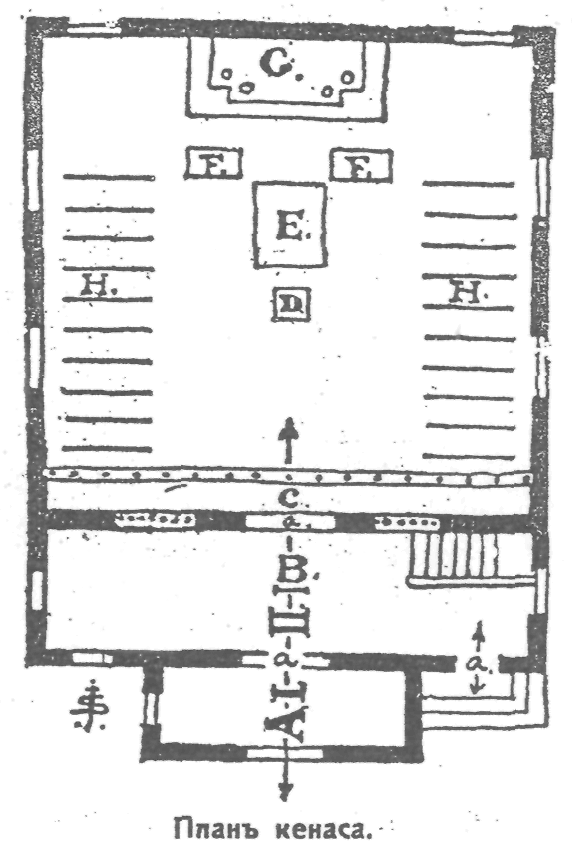
Interior plan of the Kenesa, 1912

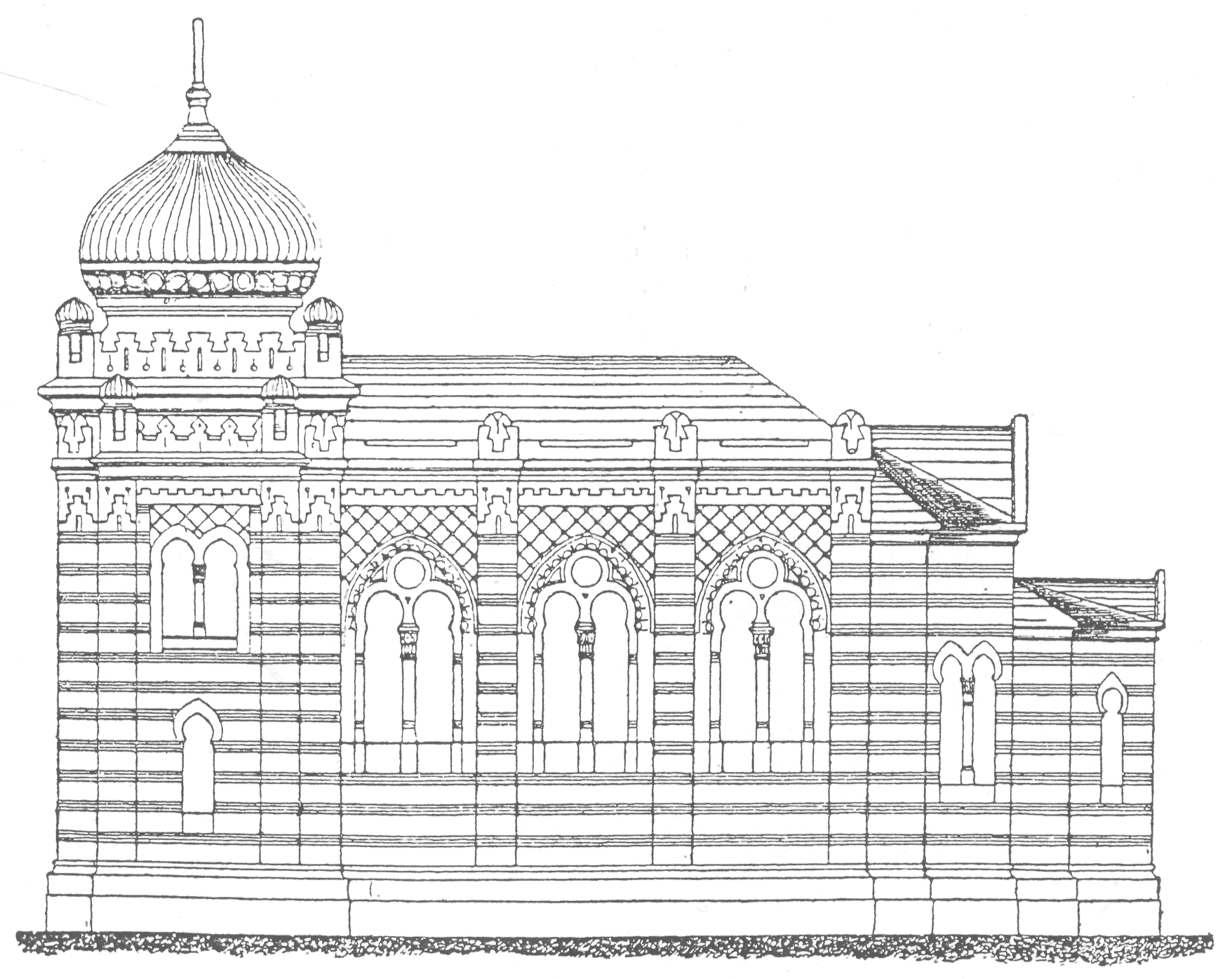
Side-view plan of the Kenesa, 1911

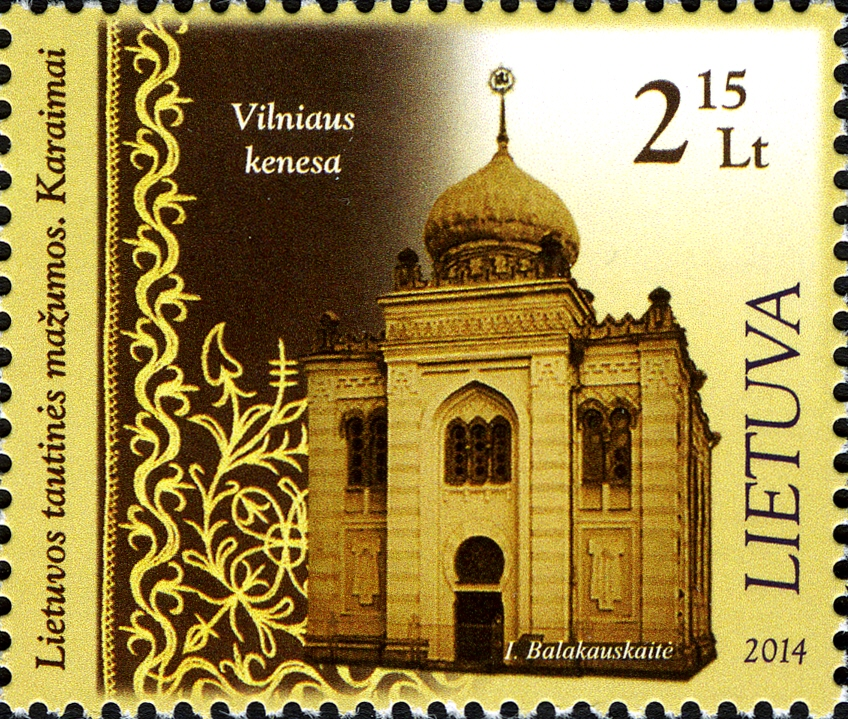
Lithuanian Post stamp with the Kenesa, released in 2014

== See also ==
- History of the Jews in Lithuania
- Lithuanian Jews
