= Žvėrynas =

- Eldership
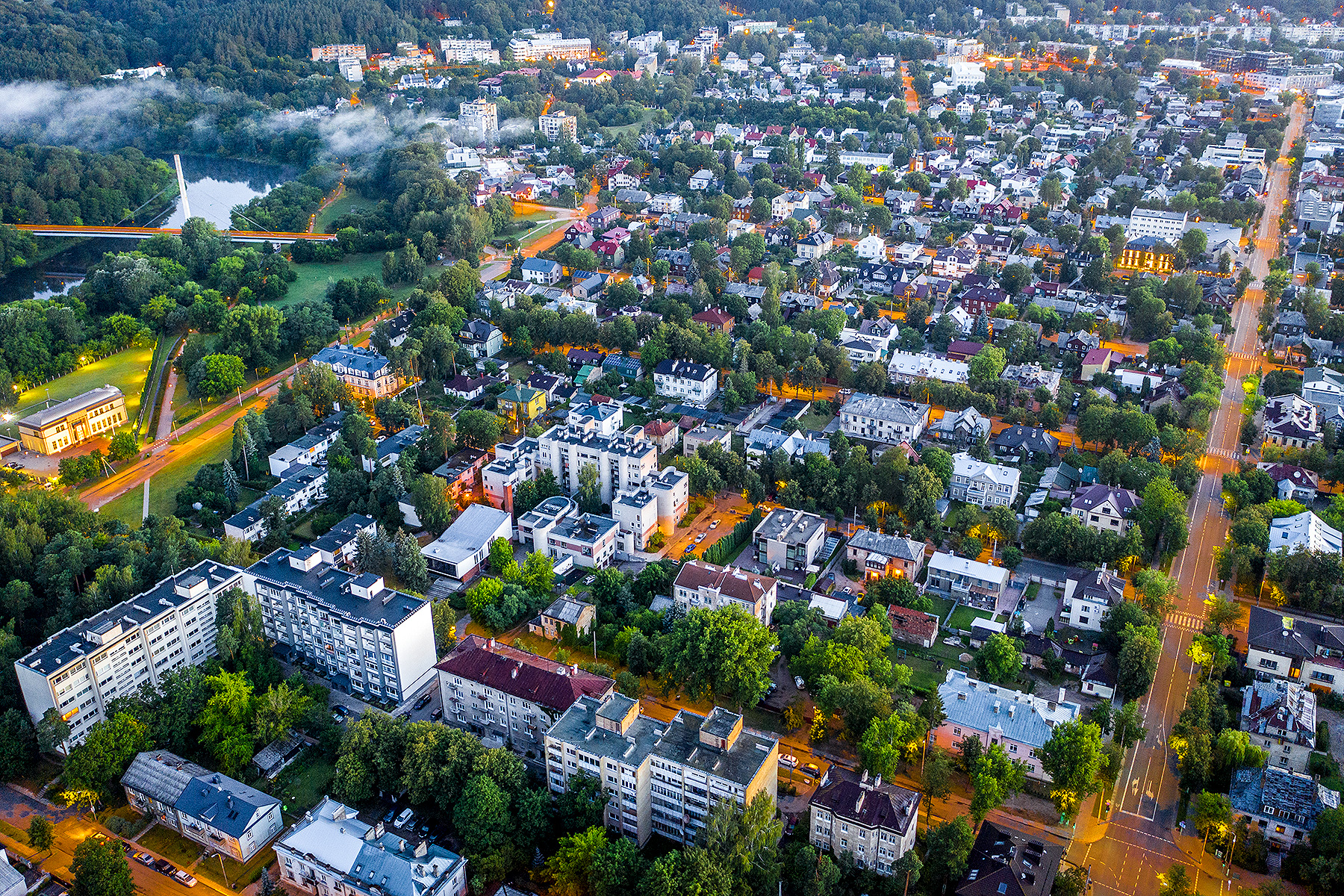
- Areial view of Žvėrynas

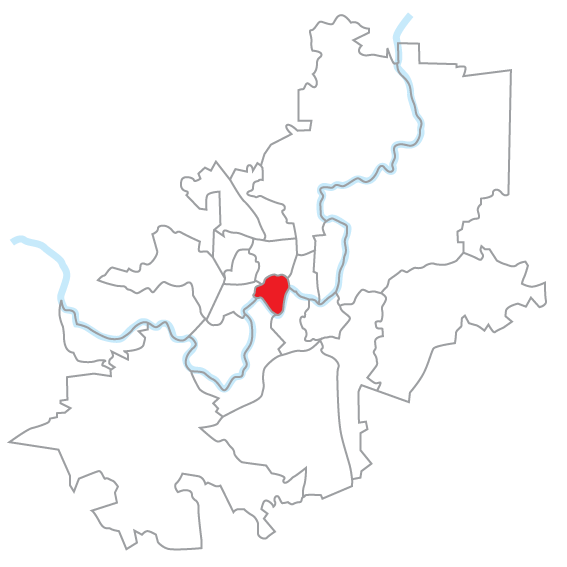

- Location of Žvėrynas
- Country: Lithuania
- County: Vilnius County
- Municipality: Vilnius city municipality

Area
  - Total: 2.6 km^{2} (1.0 sq mi)

Population (2023)
  - Total: 14,004
  - Density: 5,400/km^{2} (14,000/sq mi)
- Time zone: UTC+2 (EET)
  - Summer (DST): UTC+3 (EEST)

Žvėrynas (literally the menagerie) is one of the older neighbourhoods and smallest elderships in Vilnius, Lithuania. According to the 2011 census, 11,079 people live within its 2.6 km² area. It lies on the banks of the Neris River, and is situated to the west of the Lithuanian Parliament building. The river surrounds it from three sides and isolates it from the city. On the other side of the river, to the northwest, lies Vingis Park. Initially, it was a private out of town hunting area until the end of the 19th century, later it was developed as a resort and therefore many decorated wooden houses have survived from these times.

== History ==
Originally the district belonged to the Grand duke Vytautas the Great, who established forest reserve there, and later to Radziwiłł family, who has built wooden hunting house in the area and maintained wild animals for hunting purposes (hence the name). In 1825, a summer house was built which later became the residence of the Governor General of the Vilna Governorate. At the very end of the 19th century, Žvėrynas became the property of Russian businessman Vasiliy Martinson who in turn sold individual tracts of land to the city's residents. In 1901, the resort town was incorporated into the city of Vilnius. It remained mostly residential with very few industrial enterprises. After Lithuania regained its independence in 1990, Žvėrynas became one of the most prestigious neighborhoods of the capital due to the proximity of Seimas, the number of embassies, Neris river and the Vingis Park. Žvėrynas has a number of government and educational institutions, finance and insurance companies, as well as health care institutions. Žvėrynas is the site of Vilnius' only kenesa. There are also Russian Orthodox Our Lady of the Sign church (1899-1903) near Žvėrynas Bridge (1907), Orthodox chapel (1871) near Vingis pedestrian bridge and Catholic church in the Northern part of the district, the later being not finished according to the project because of the World War I (façade towers and dome were never built). Žvėrynas is famous for its well preserved and maintained wooden architecture and interwar brick villas as well as modern architecture. There are more than a hundred wooden summer cottages and city villas, built mostly in 1890s-1910s. Compositors' modernist quarter of 16 villas, designed for leading Lithuanian musicians and a palace for concerts and various events, were built in the 1960s. Prestigious Jewish Sholem Aleichem Gymnasium is situated in Žvėrynas.

Žvėrynas
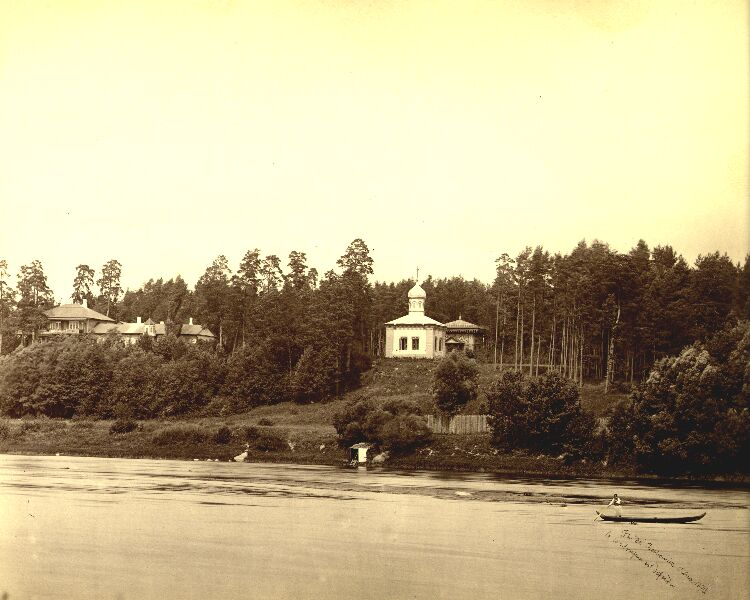
View of Žvėrynas in 1873-1881

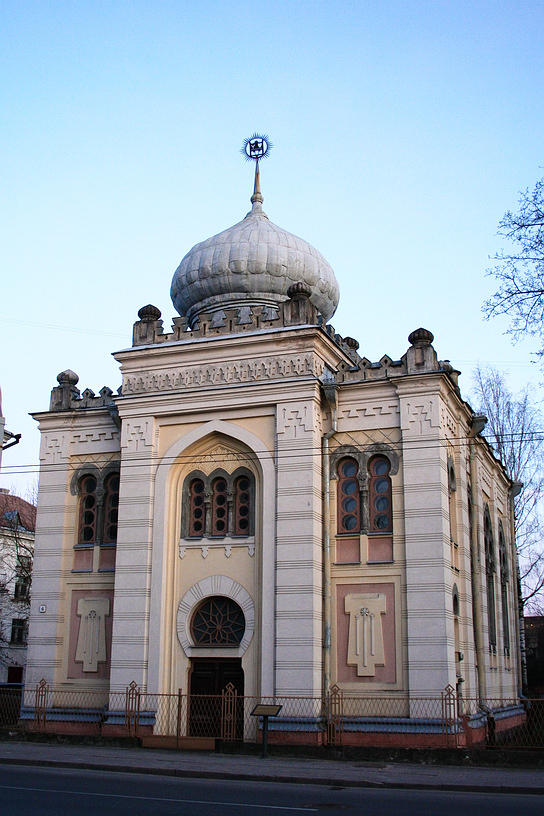
Karaite kenesa in Žvėrynas.

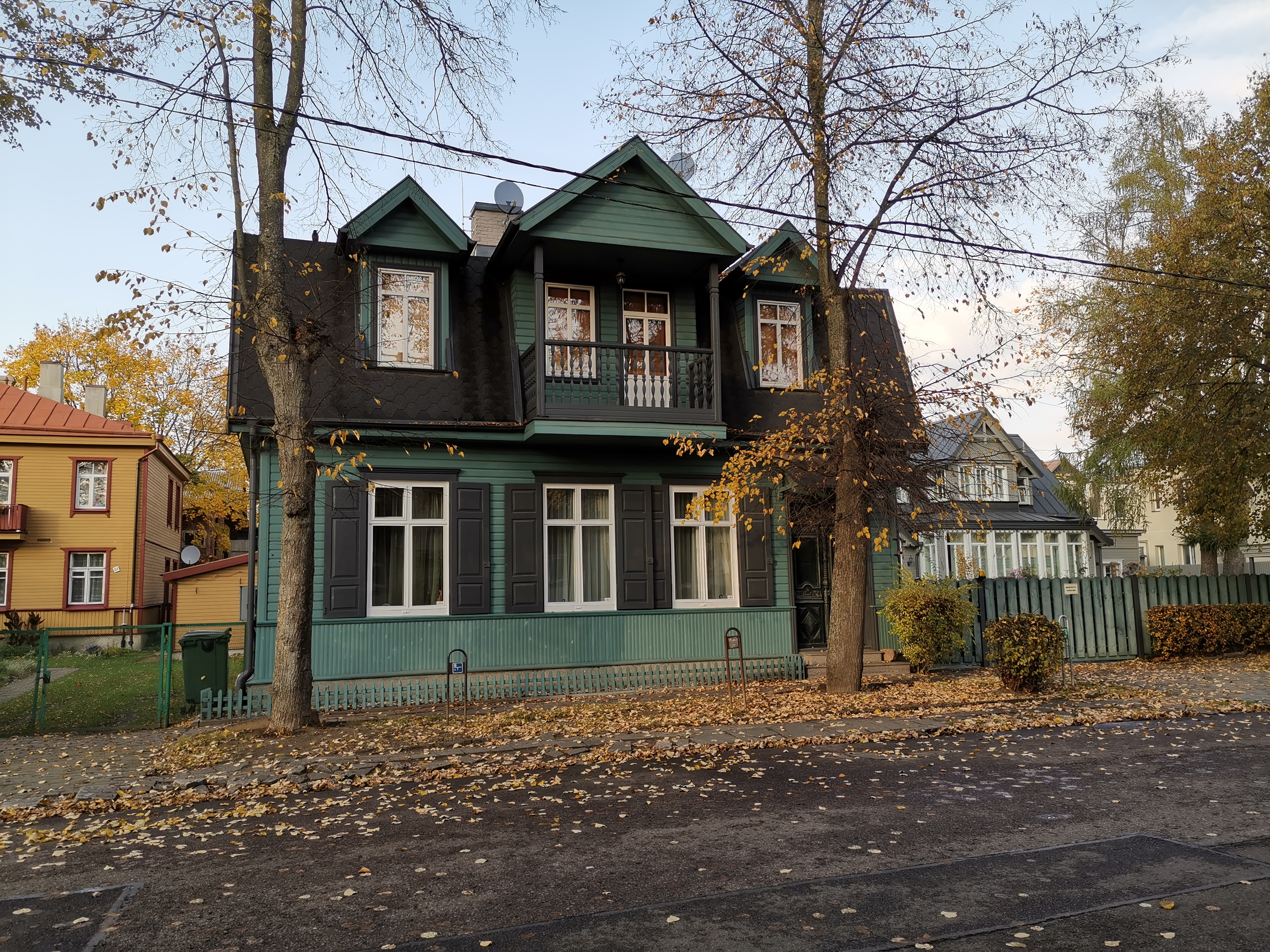
Wooden private house in Žvėrynas.

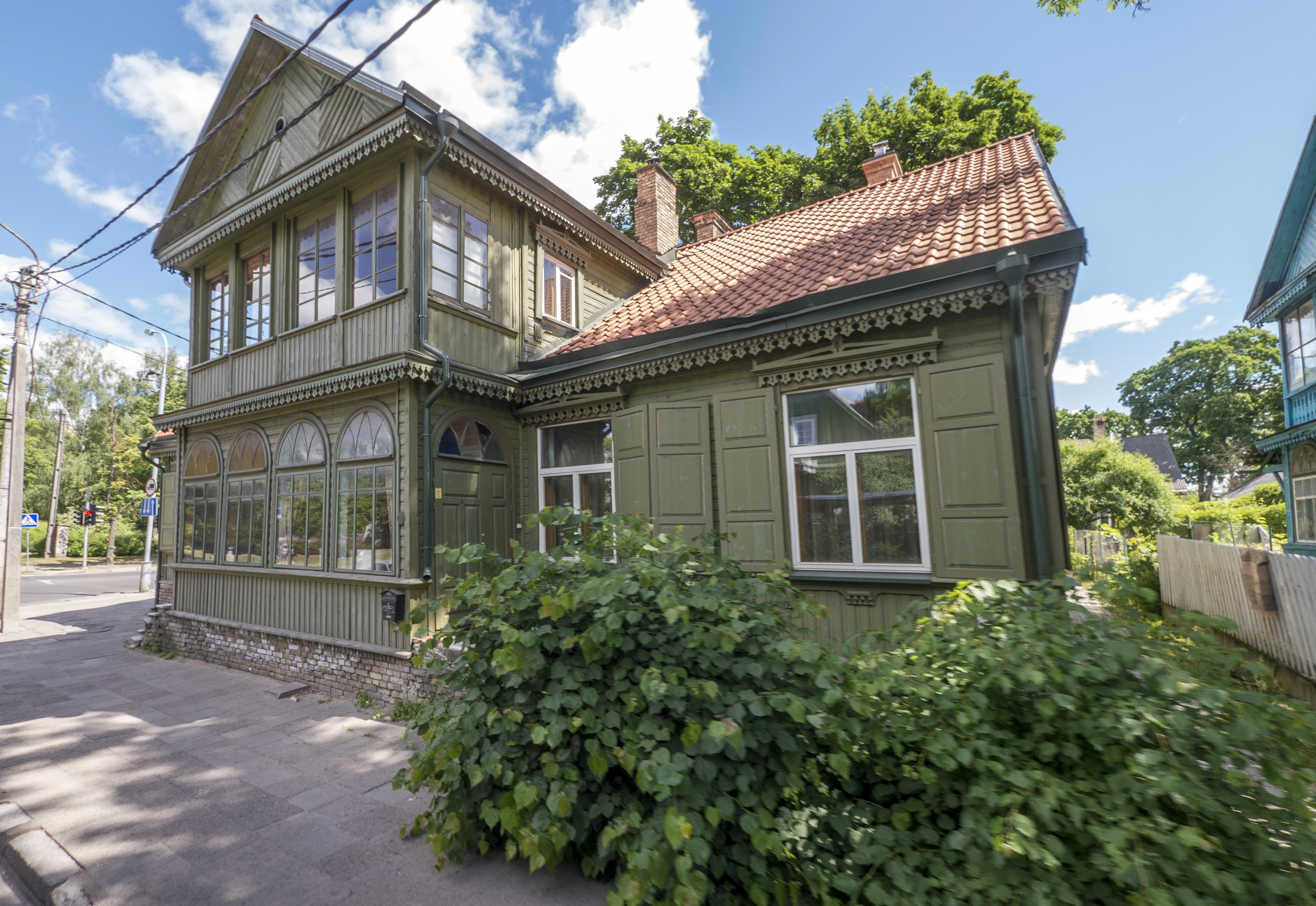
Wooden private house in Žvėrynas.

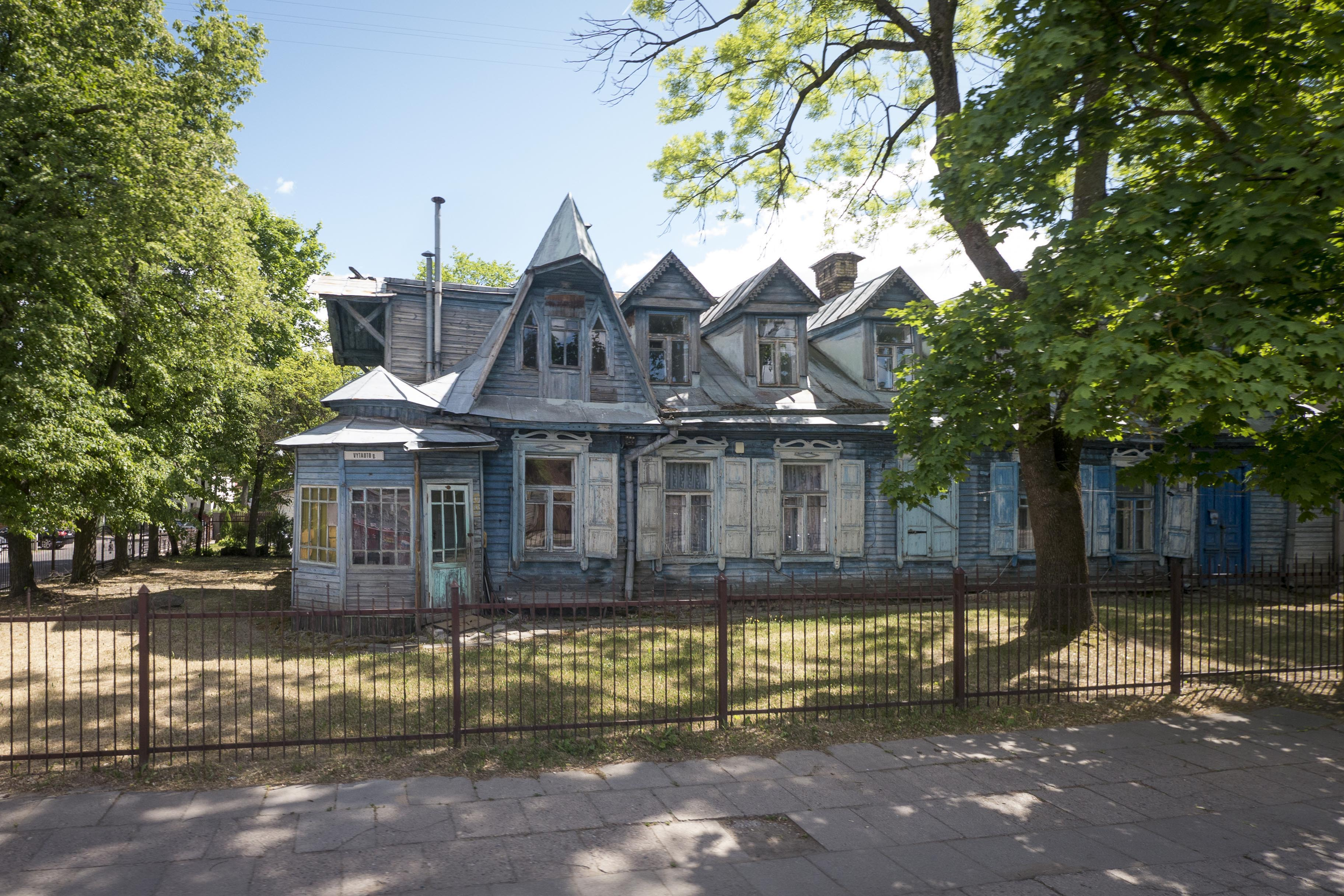
Wooden private house in Žvėrynas.

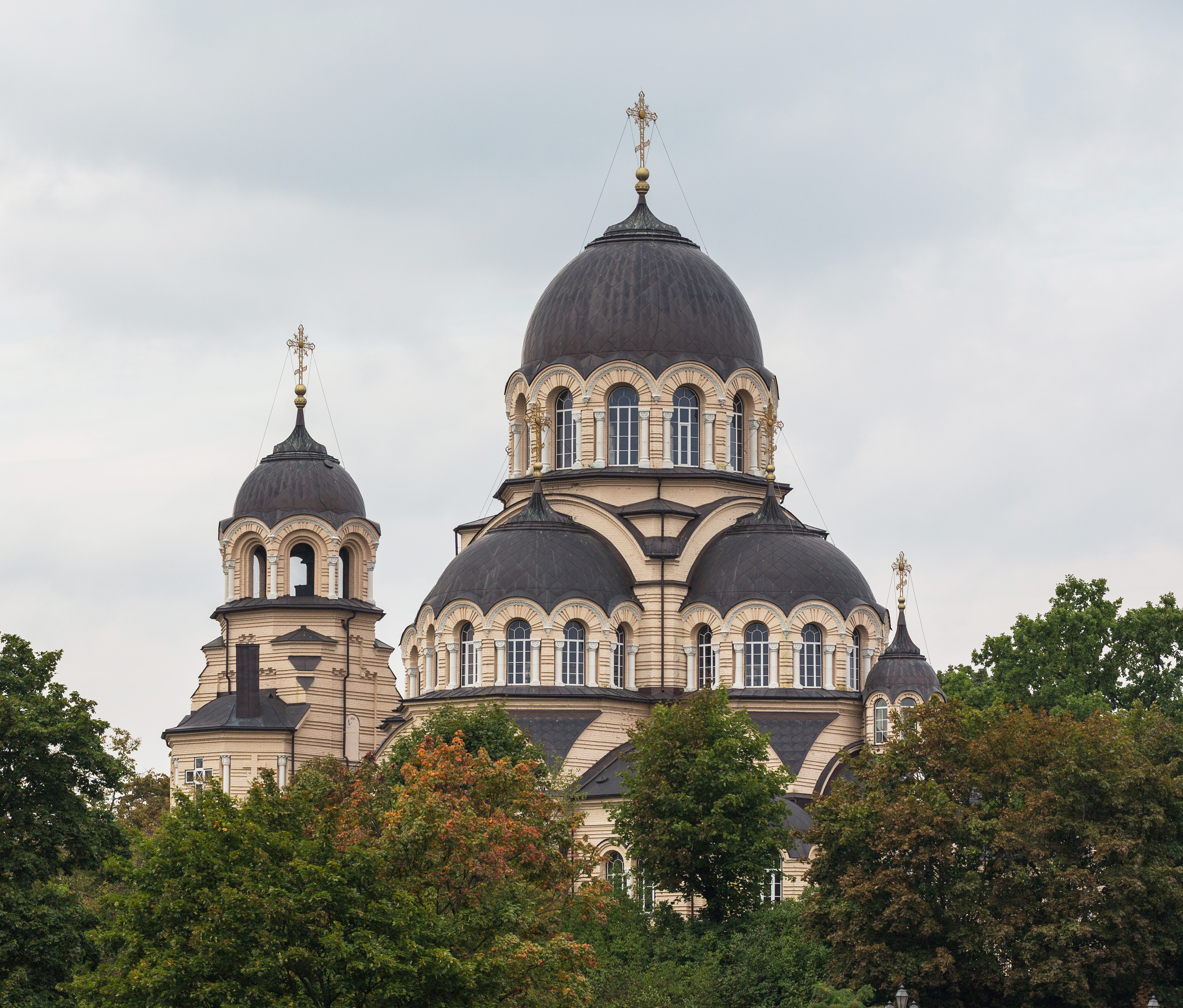
Orthodox church in Žvėrynas.

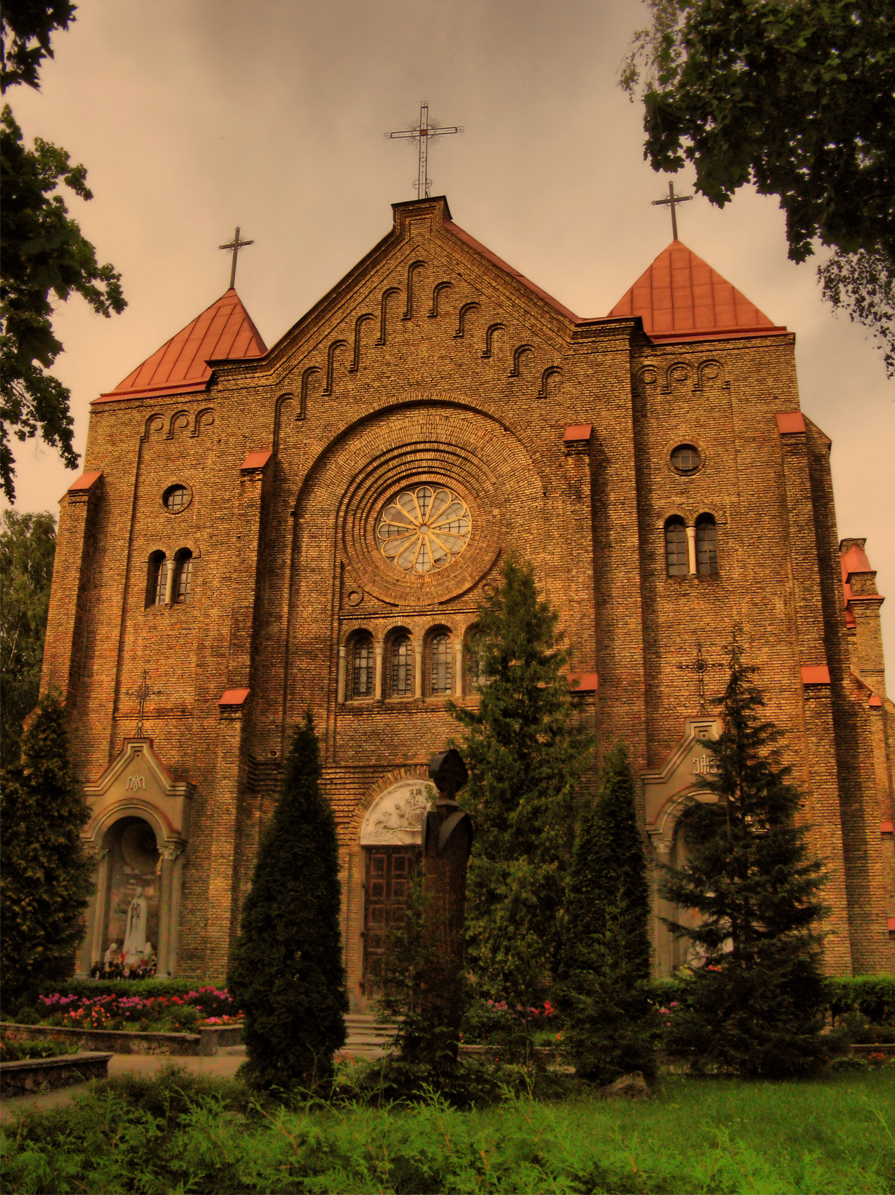
Catholic church in Žvėrynas.

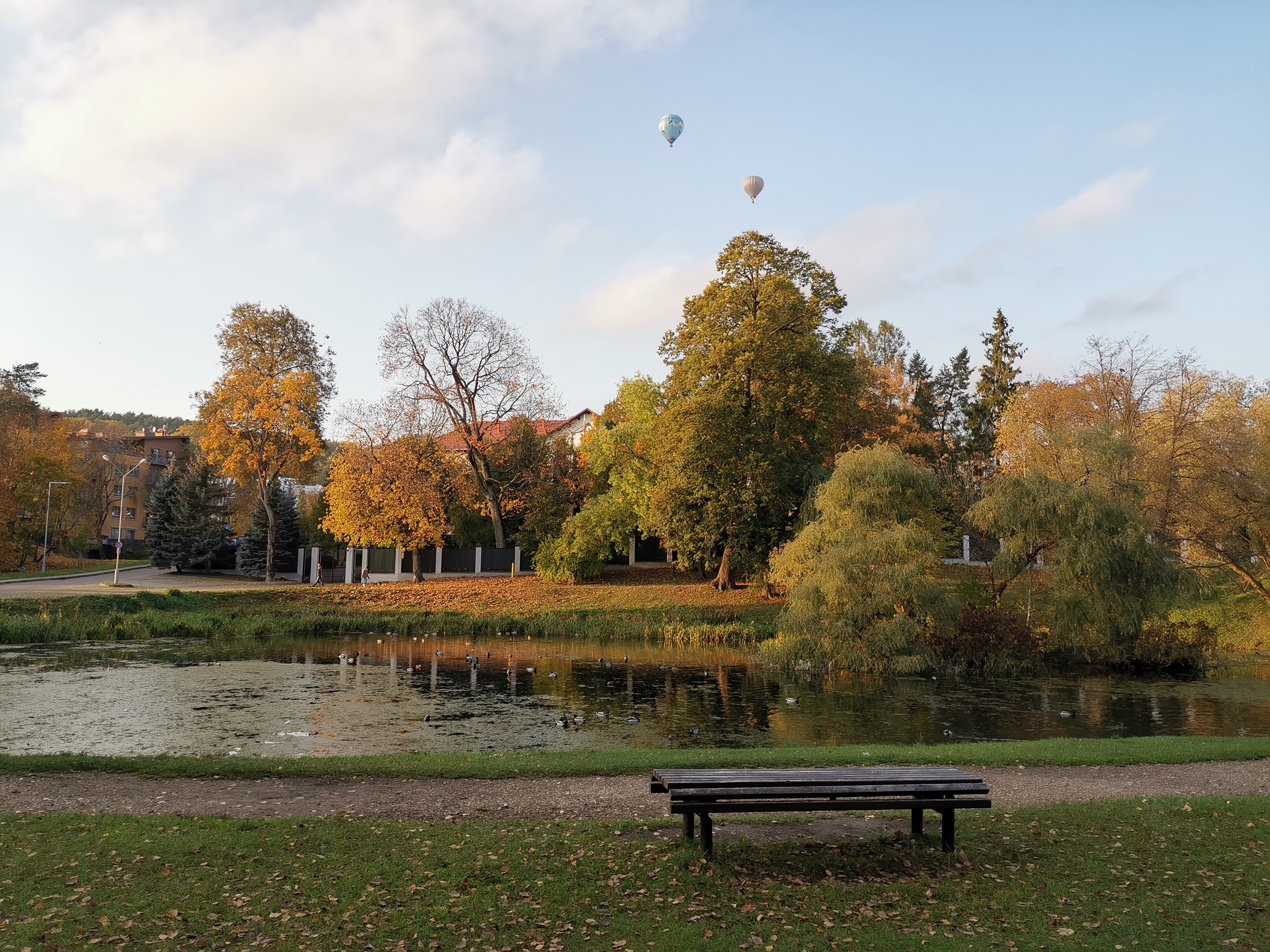
Boris Nemtsov Square in Žvėrynas.

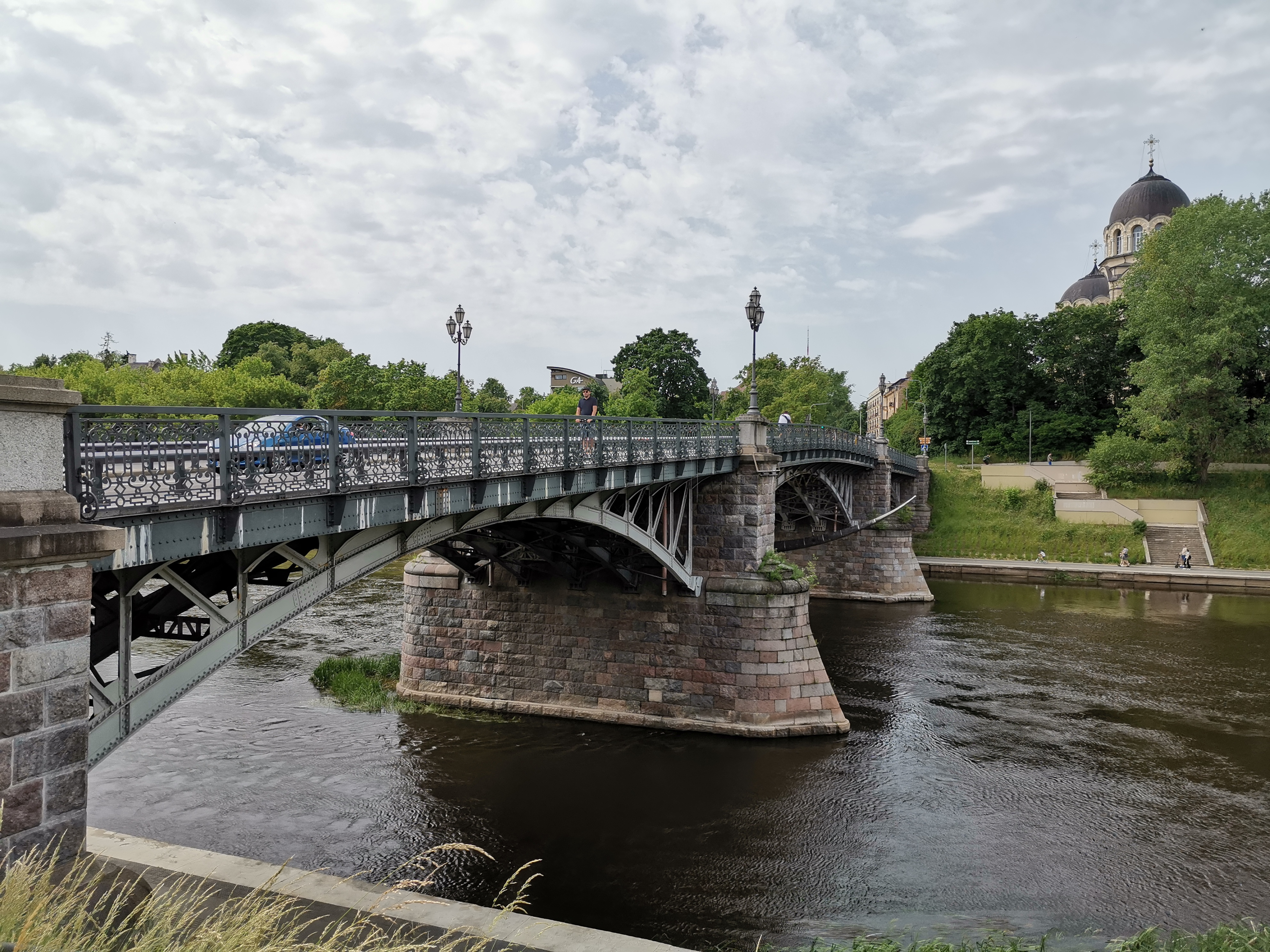
Žvėrynas Bridge, view towards the district

Green Hall business centre in Žvėrynas.
