= Karaite Synagogue (Istanbul) =

Kenesa in Istanbul, Turkey

- Hebrew: בית הכנסת הקראי באיסטנבול; Turkish: Karahim Sinagogu
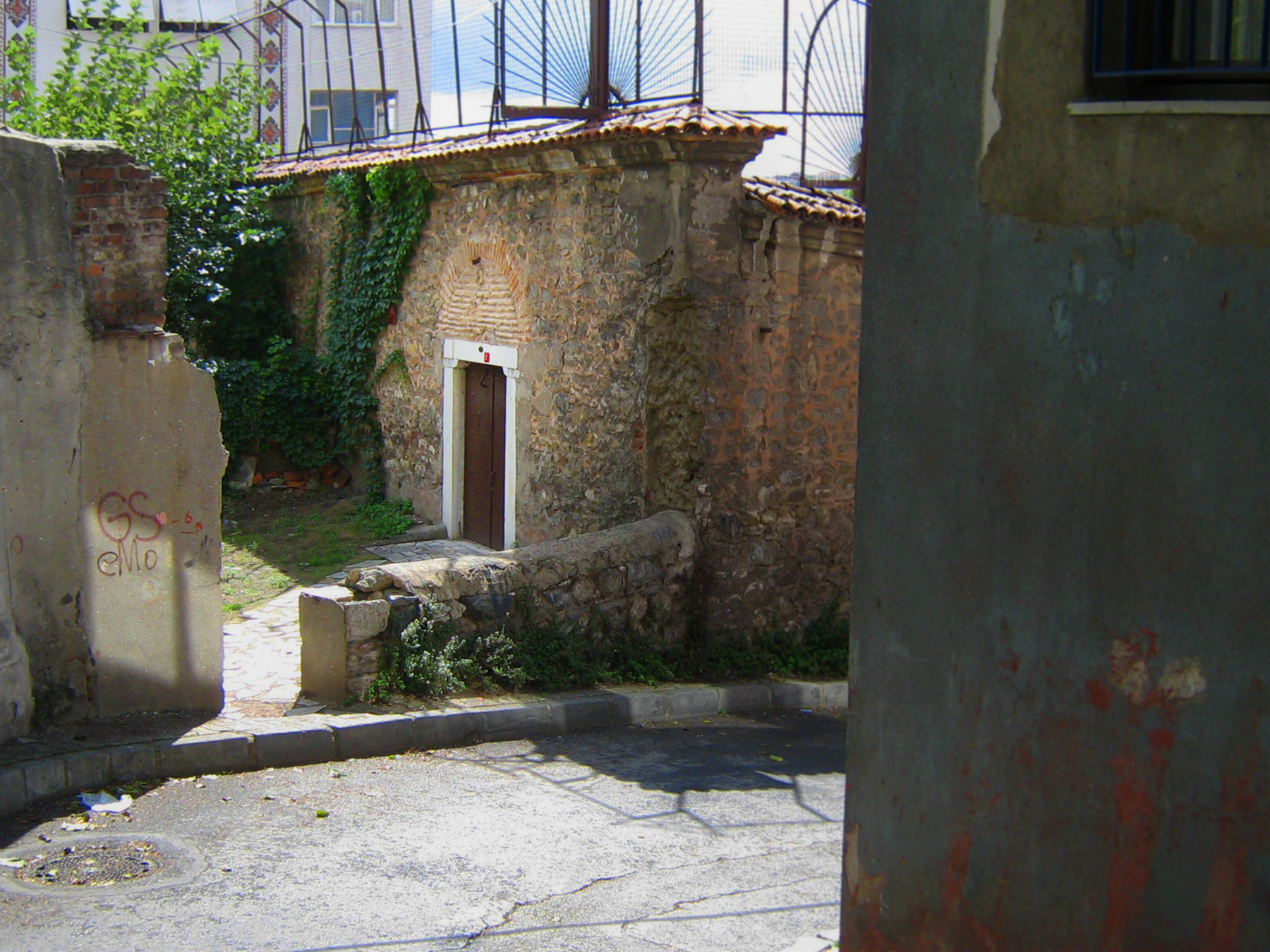
- The synagogue, in 2009

- Location of the synagogue in Istanbul

Religion
- Affiliation: Judaism
- Rite: Karaite
- Ecclesiastical or organisational status: Kenesa
- Status: Active

Location
- Location: Dere Street, Hasköy, Beyoğlu, Istanbul, Istanbul Province
- Country: Turkey
- Coordinates: 41°02′24″N 28°57′09.6″E

Architecture
- Type: Synagogue architecture
- Style: Byzantine
- Groundbreaking: 1840
- Completed: 1842; 1918 (renovations)
- Materials: Stone

The Karaite Synagogue (Hebrew: בית הכנסת הקראי באיסטנבול, romanized: Bēṯ hak-Kənesseṯ haq-Qārāʾī bəʼĪsṭanbūl; Turkish: Karahim Sinagogu, Karaim Sinagogu, Karayim Sinagogu) is a Karaite Jewish congregation and kenesa or synagogue, located on Dere Street, in Hasköy, in the Beyoğlu district of Istanbul, in the Istanbul Province of Turkey. Completed in 1842, the synagogue is open, yet only open for the Karaite Passover services, or by arrangement.

== History ==
The building's date of construction is unclear; it may date to Byzantine times. The building was in ruins in the sixteenth century; it was repaired in 1536, burned in 1729, rebuilt, burned again in 1774, rebuilt between 1776 and 1780, restored in 1842, and burned again in 1918. The Karaite congregation of the town also has a cemetery. The trust behind these institutions is called Hasköy Türk Karaim Musevi Sinagogu Vakfı. Today the Kenesa functions only at the Karaite Passover. Contact to the congregation can be built via the Turkish Chief Rabbinate or the Jewish Museum of Turkey.

== See also ==
- History of the Jews in Turkey
- List of synagogues in Turkey
- Constantinopolitan Karaites
- Karaite Judaism
