= Žvėrynas Bridge =

Bridge in Vilnius, Lithuania

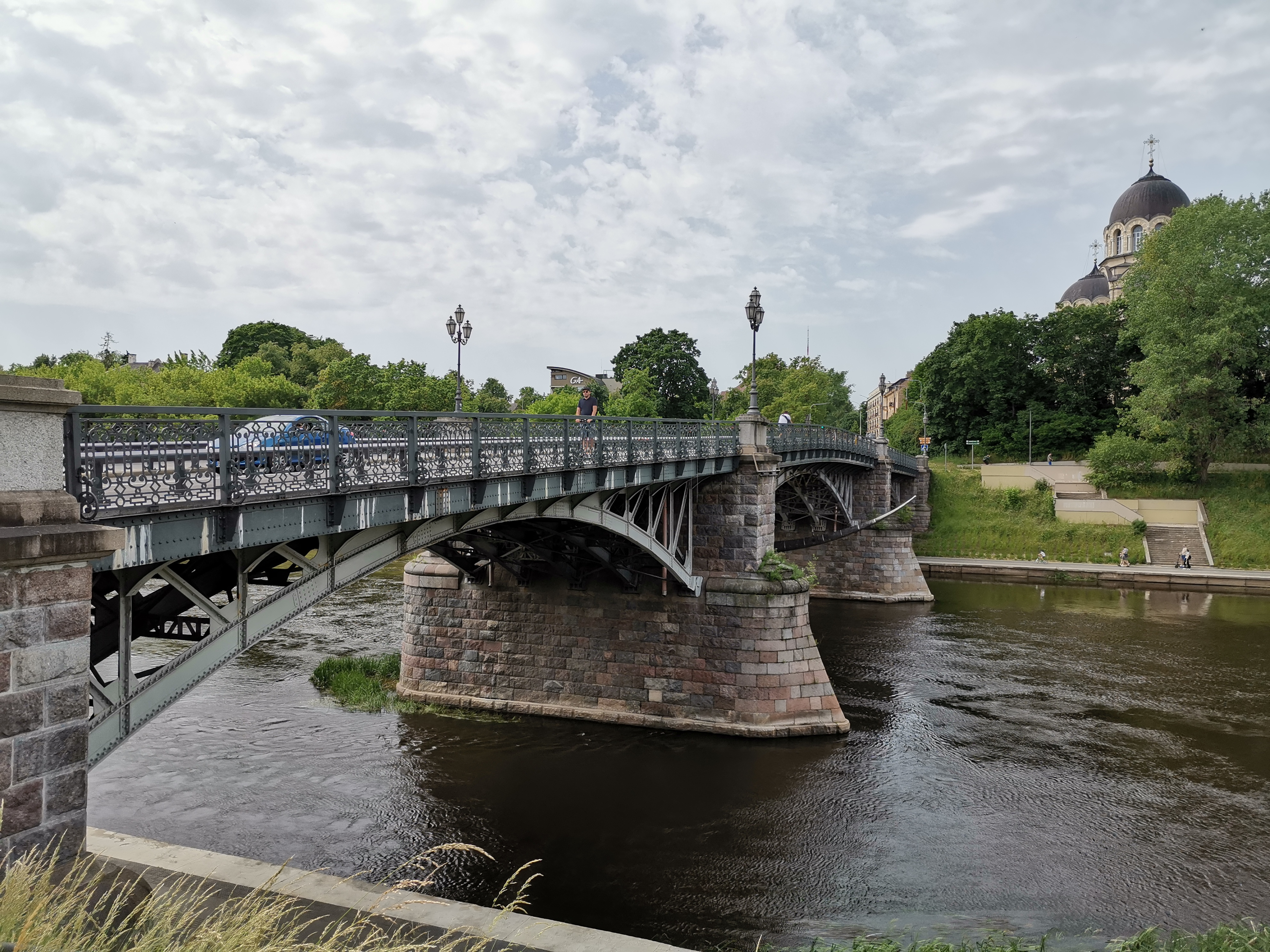
- Coordinates: 54°41′25″N 25°15′32″E
- Crosses: Neris River
- Locale: Vilnius
- Preceded by: Iron Wolf Bridge
- Followed by: Liubartas Bridge

Characteristics
- Total length: 103.1 metres (338 ft)
- Width: 11.35 metres (37.2 ft)
- Height: 11 metres (36 ft)

History
- Opened: 1892
- Rebuilt: 1906

Location
- Interactive map of Žvėrynas Bridge

The Žvėrynas Bridge (Lithuanian: Žvėryno tiltas) is a bridge over the Neris River in Vilnius, Lithuania. It connects Naujamiestis with the district of Žvėrynas.

== History ==
The bridge was first built of timber in 1892 by a landowner in Žvėrynas. The landowner hoped to make Žvėrynas a part of the Vilnius city, as it was a suburb at that time. The bridge was rebuilt by the city in 1906 using a steel structure with stone piers. It was overhauled in 1937. The bridge suffered significant damage during the World War II but was repaired quite quickly. In 1991, during the January Events, defensive barricades were built on the bridge.

In 2014, LED lighting was installed for colourful illuminations in the evenings.

== Gallery ==
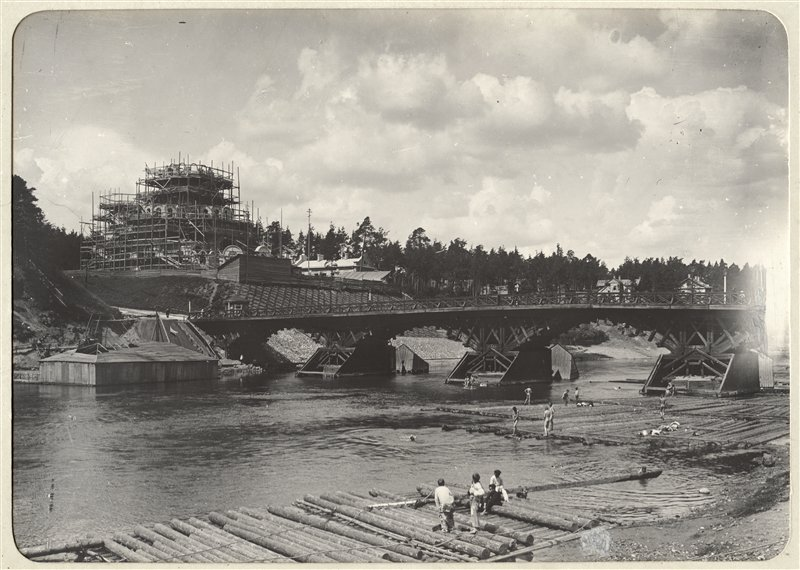
Timber bridge, circa 1900

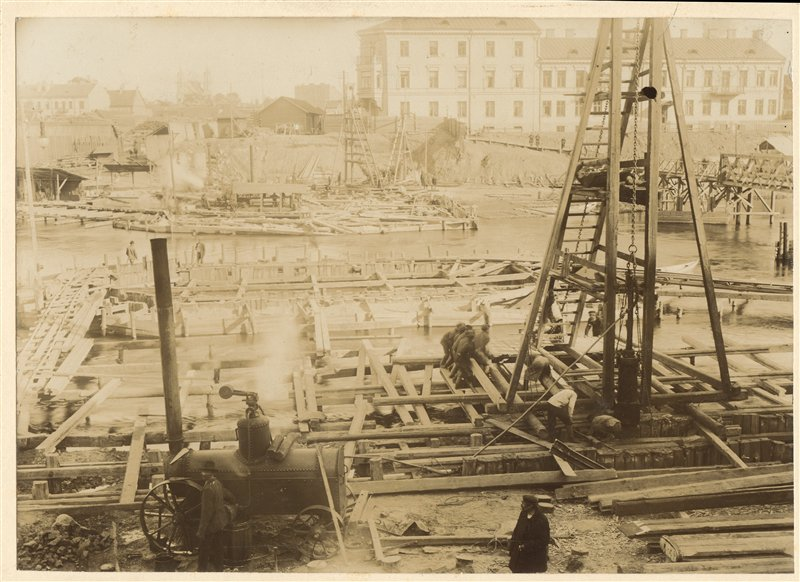
Construction in 1906

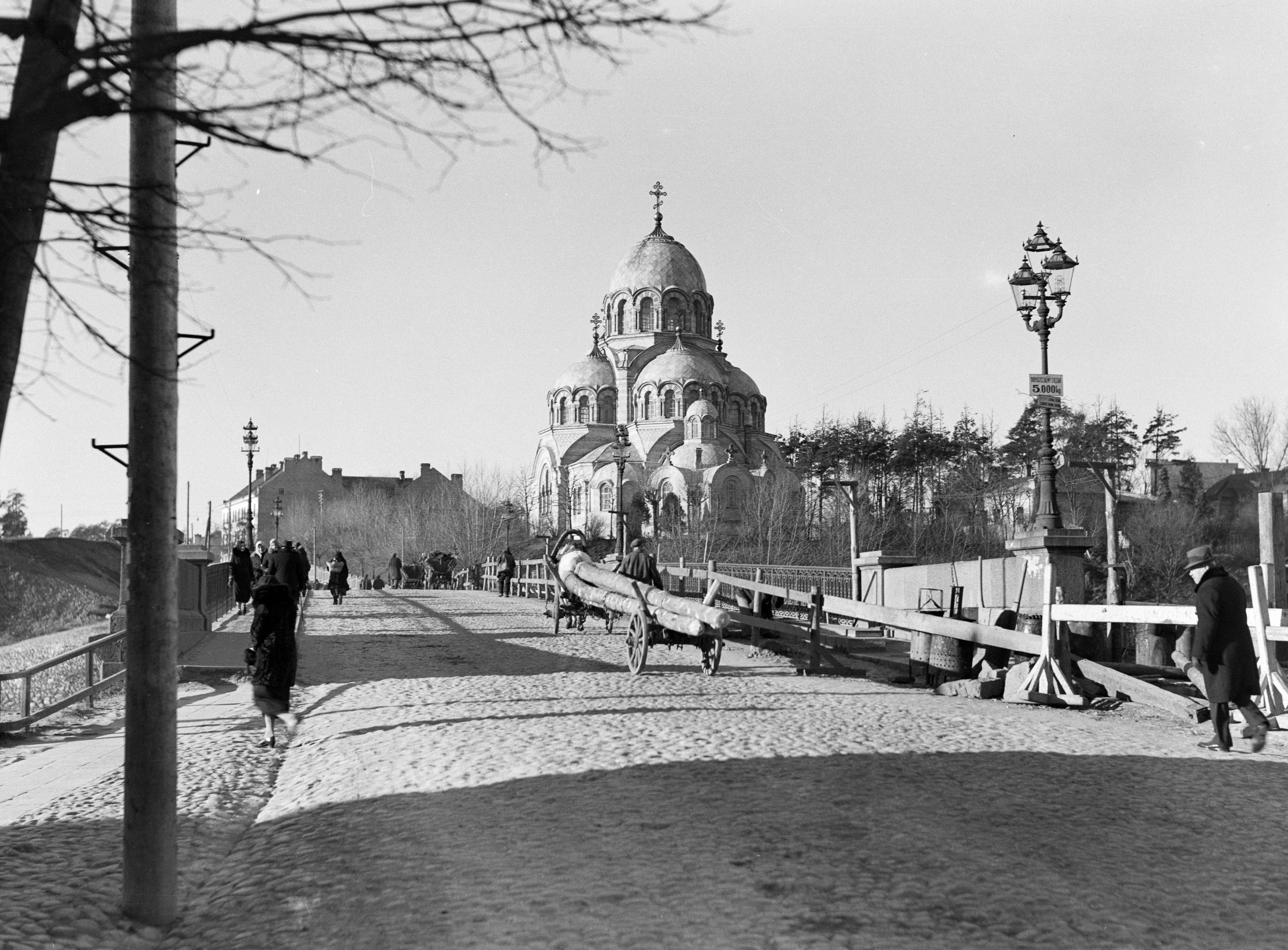
Bridge in 1934

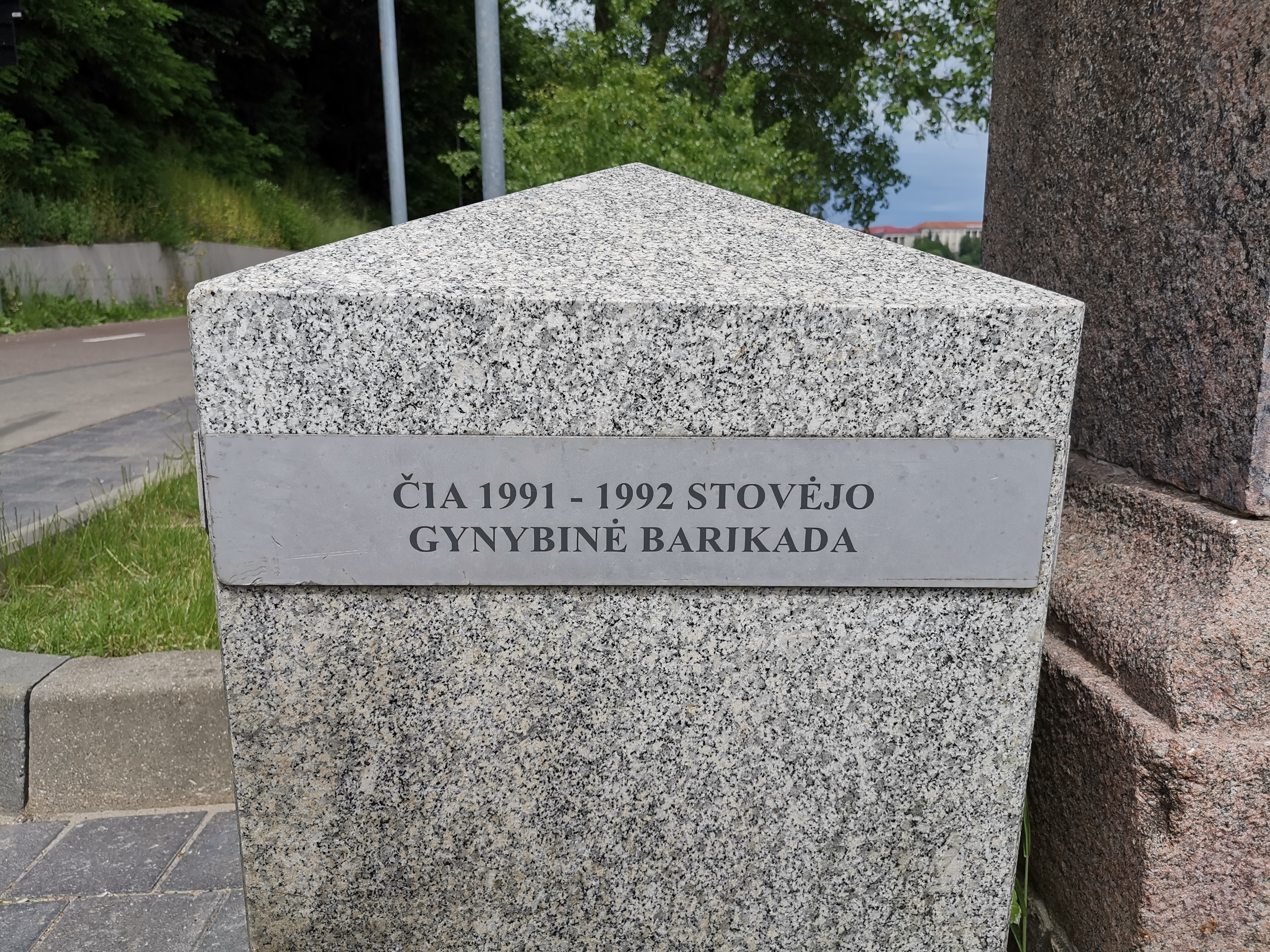
Commemorative stone about the 1991 barricades

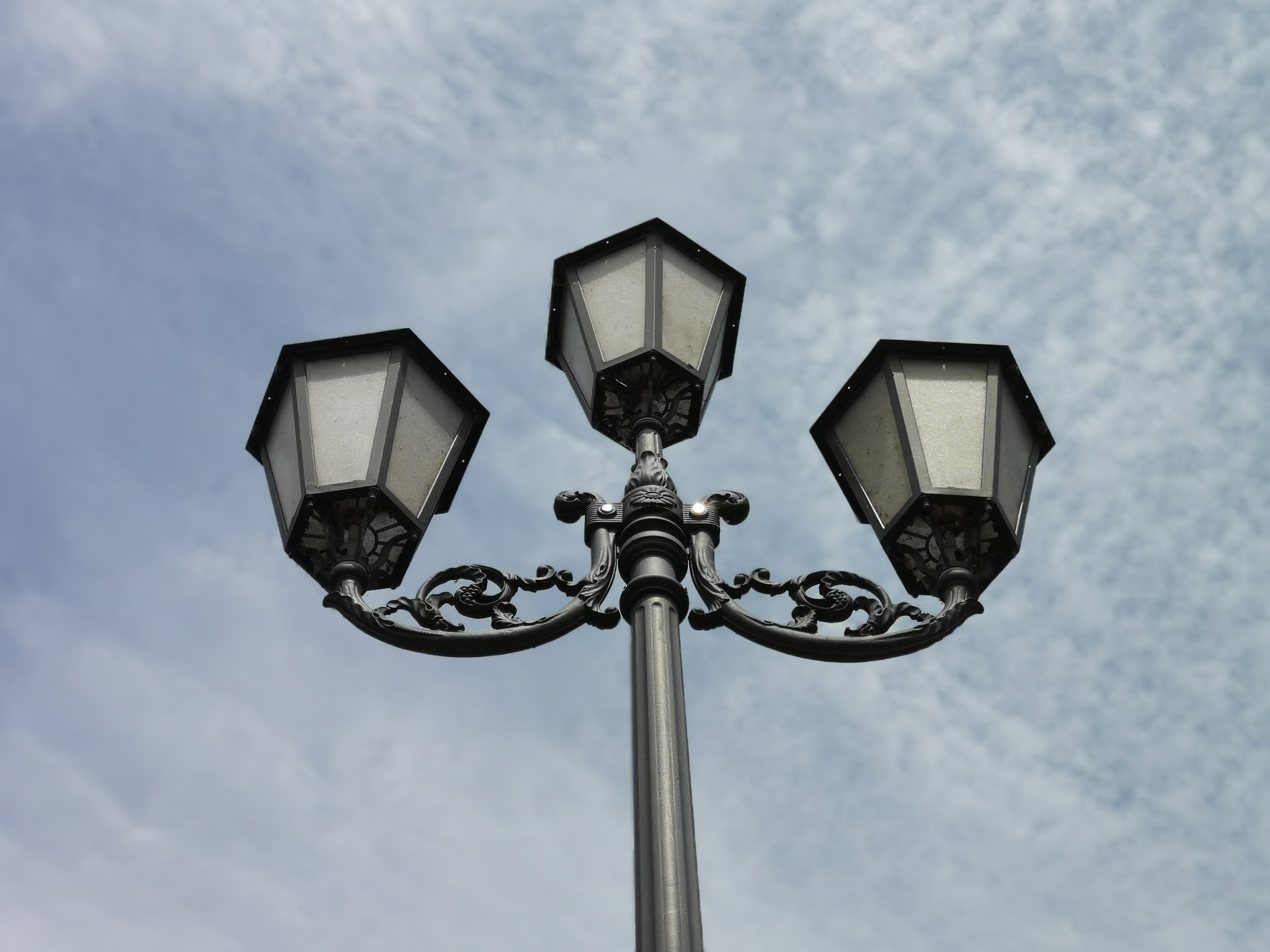
Lights on the bridge

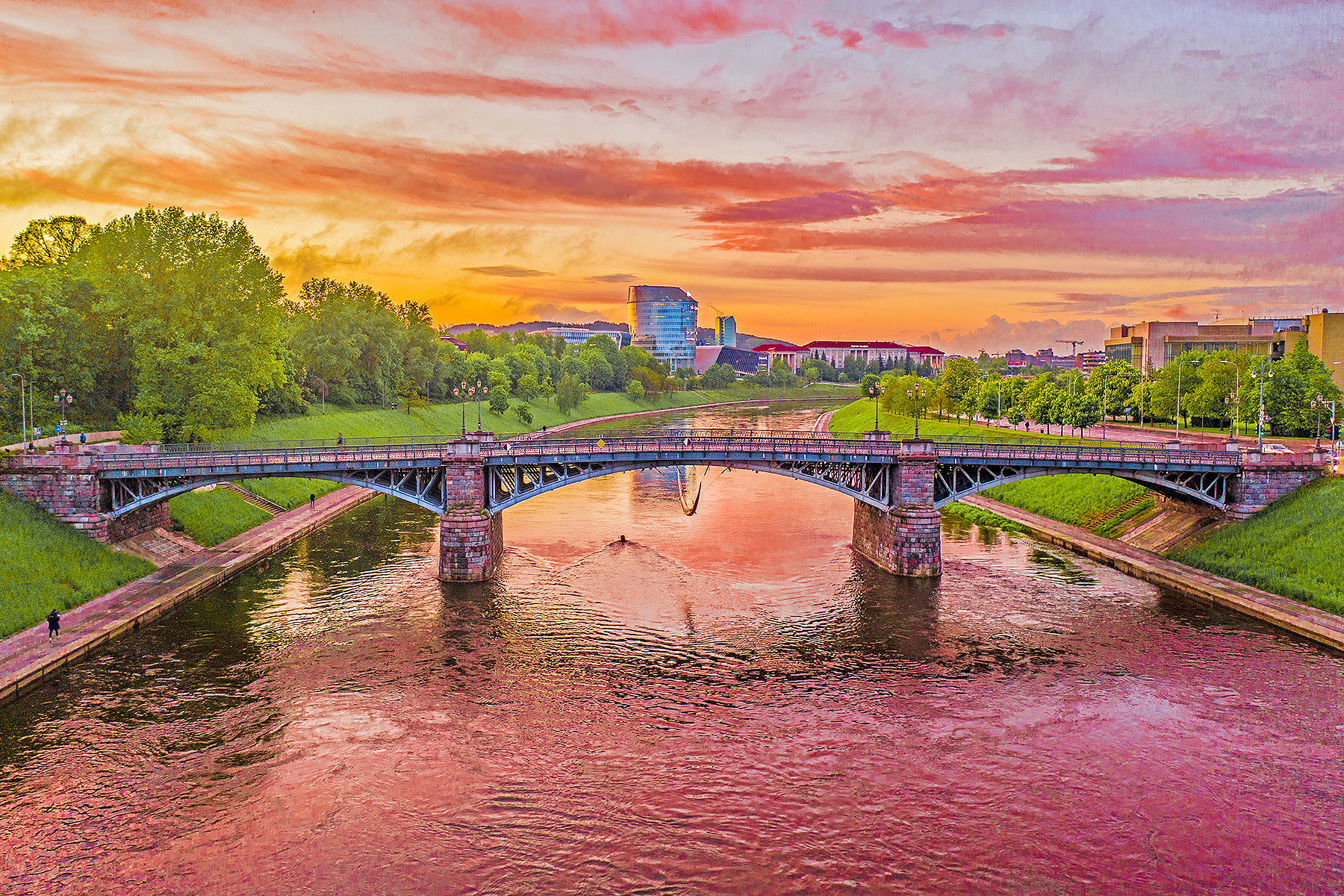
Areal view, 2021
