= Kenesa =

Persian Jewish and Crimean Karaite equivalent to synagogue

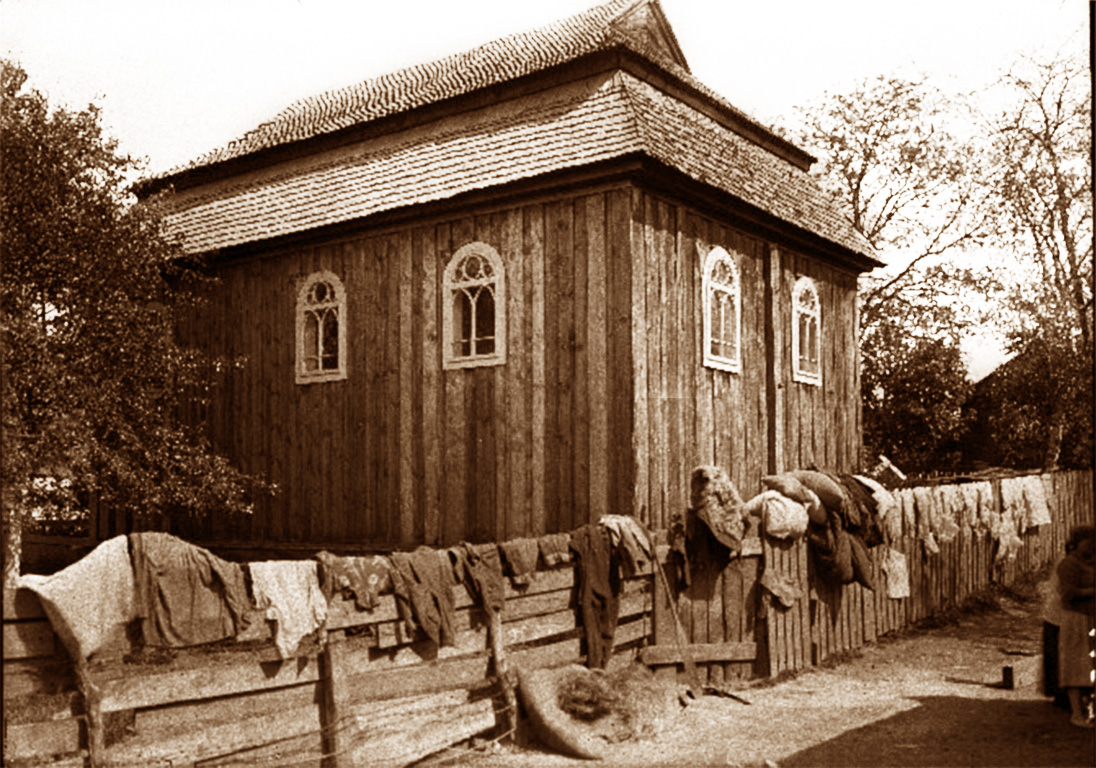
Karaite kenesa in Lutsk (Ukraine)

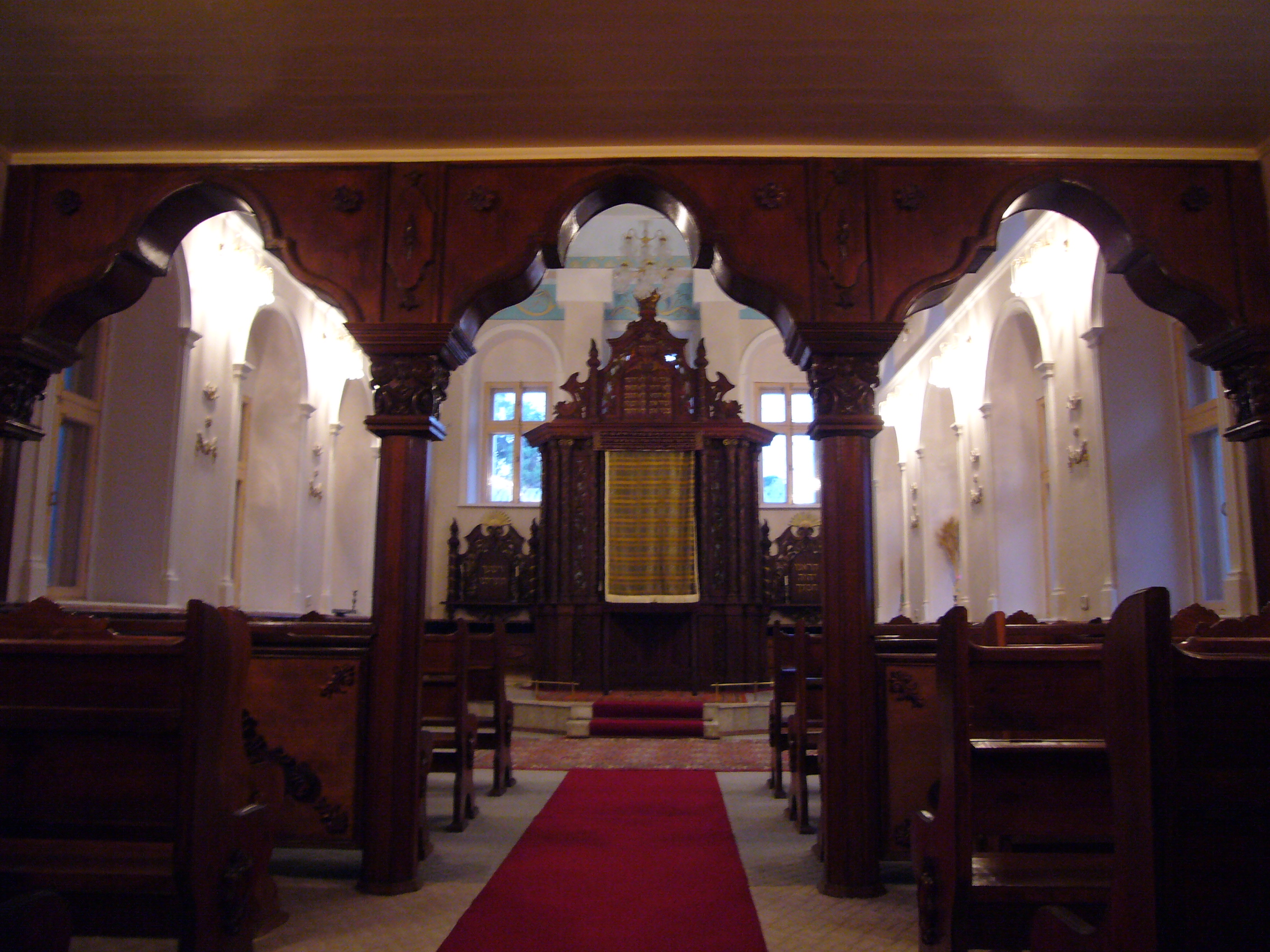
Interior of Malaya (Small) kenesa in Yevpatoria, Crimea.

A kenesa (Karaim: כְּנִיסָא, romanized: kǝnîsāʾ) is an Eastern European or Persian Karaite synagogue.

Kenesas are similar to Rabbinical synagogues. In Eastern Europe, they are laid out along north-south axis (facing Jerusalem). Starting from the northern entrance, a kenesa contains:

- Vestibule (azar), where worshipers take off their shoes. Shoes are not permitted anywhere further.
- Moshav Zeqenim (מושב זקנים, old men's pews): wooden benches for the old and the mourners, usually under a low ceiling. The loft above this ceiling is reserved for the women, who remain invisible to the men on the main floor.
- Shulḥan (Hebrew: שולחן "table"): the main hall. Traditional Karaite worship was performed on the knees. In the past, kenesa floors were carpeted; modern kenesas have pews in the main hall.
- Hekhal, or altar (היכל): raised stand for the ritual Ark and the priest.

Some kenesas also have a rood screen.

== Etymology ==
The word derives from Arabic كنيسة "church" or كنيس "synagogue" (ultimately from the Semitic root k-n-s in the sense of "to assemble") and is first found in Karaim and Karaite Hebrew texts from the late nineteenth century. Before this, and commonly after, Karaites used the standard Jewish terms בית הכנסת and synagogue. In Galicia, the word was often shortened to kensa as early as 1903.

In Russian it is usually pronounced кенасá (kenasá) with an ultimate stress. Some claim it has a Persian or Aramaic origin.

== Surviving kenesas ==
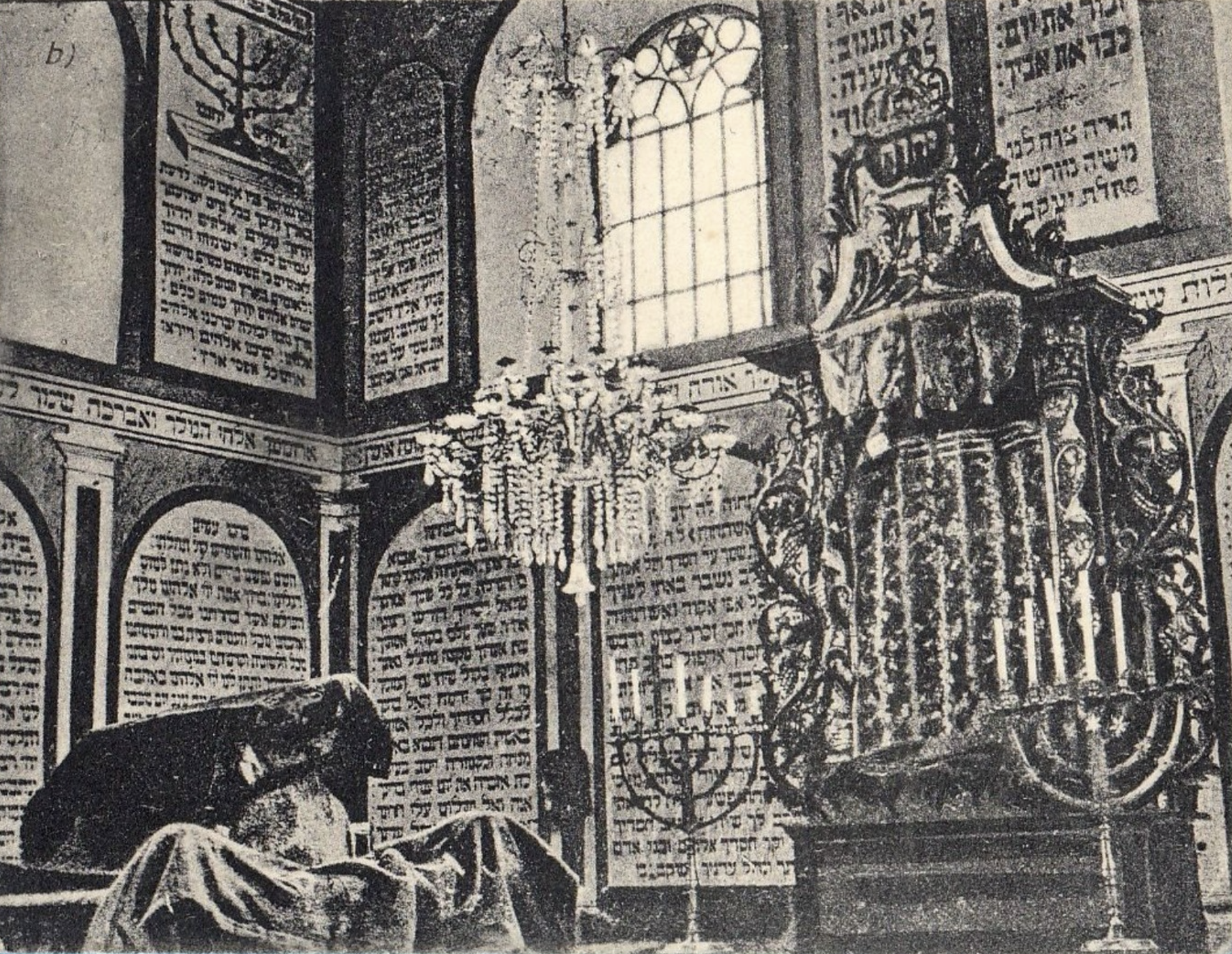
Interior of a kenesa in Halych, Ukraine (1913). Destroyed in 1985.

There were 20 kenesas in the former Russian Empire, nine of them in Crimea (by 1918, two more were added). All surviving kenesas are listed memorial buildings, however, many are in a dilapidated state, and others, like Sebastopol kenesa, although in better shape, are managed by public authorities or private owners, not the Karaite communities. The principal, operating place of Karaite worship in Ukraine is located in Yevpatoria, Crimea. It actually contains two independent kenesas, re-opened to the public in 2005 and 1999.

Karaite synagogues in Lithuania were built in the 14th century, in Trakai, Biržai, Kėdainiai, Panevėžys and Vilnius. An early 20th-century kenesa still stands in Trakai, Lithuania and another one in Vilnius; both are in service. No Karaite synagogues survived in Galicia, where Karaites were present since the 13th century; the last kenesa in Halych was destroyed by the Soviets in 1985. Only the Karaite Synagogue in Istanbul survives in Turkey.

== Gallery ==
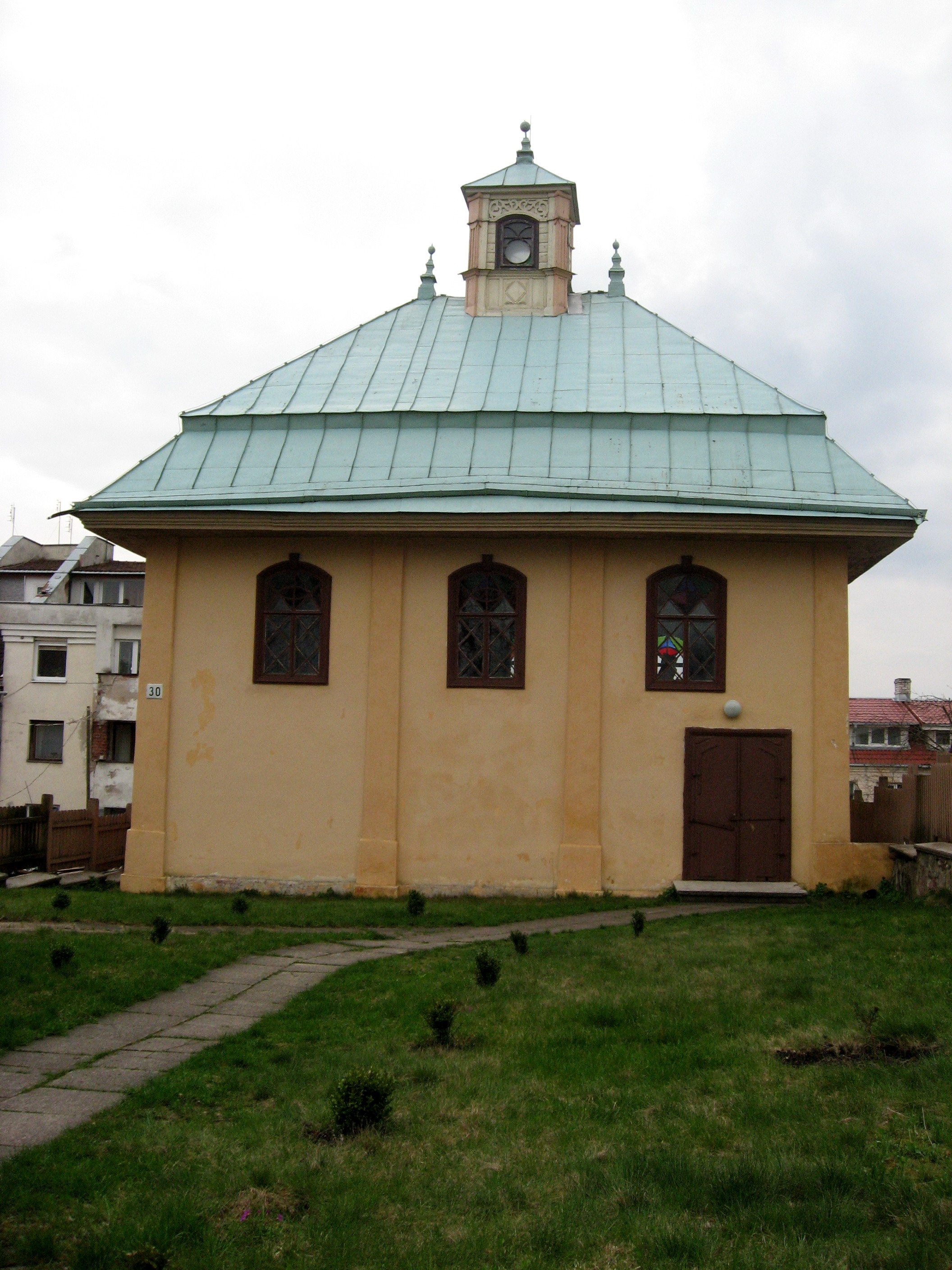
Trakai Kenesa in Trakai, Lithuania

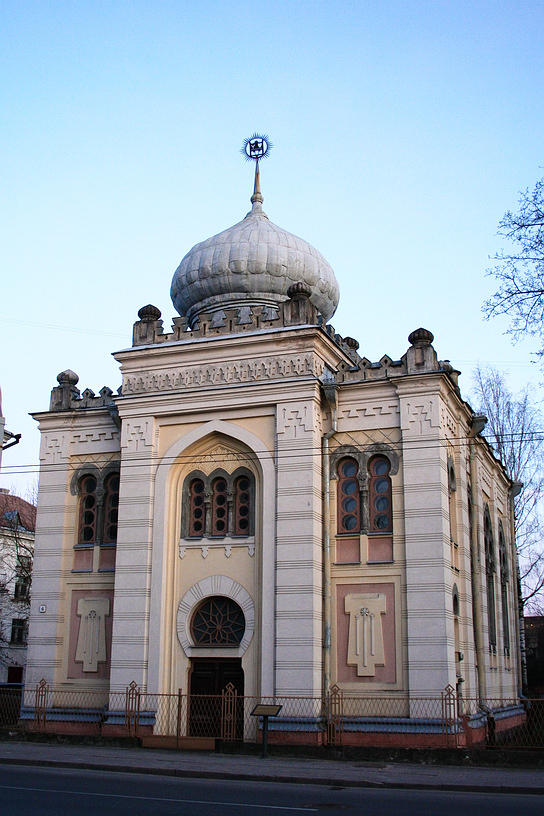
Vilnius Kenesa, Lithuania

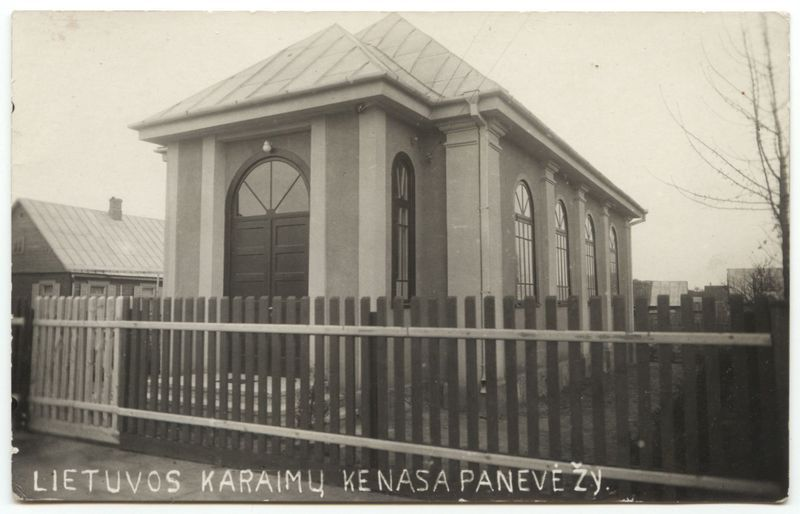
Panevėžys, Lithuania, 1939

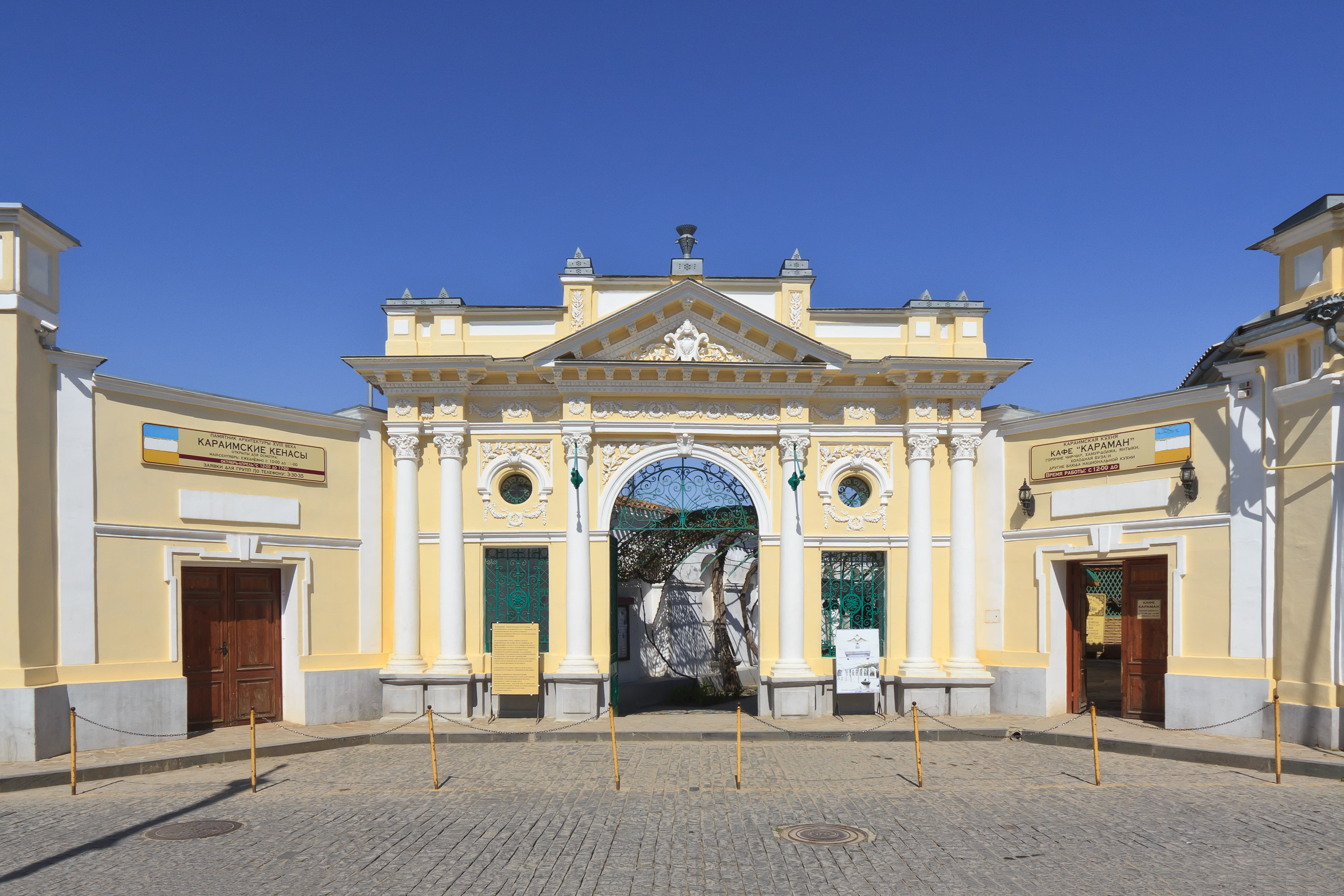
Eupatorian Kenassas in Yevpatoria, Crimea

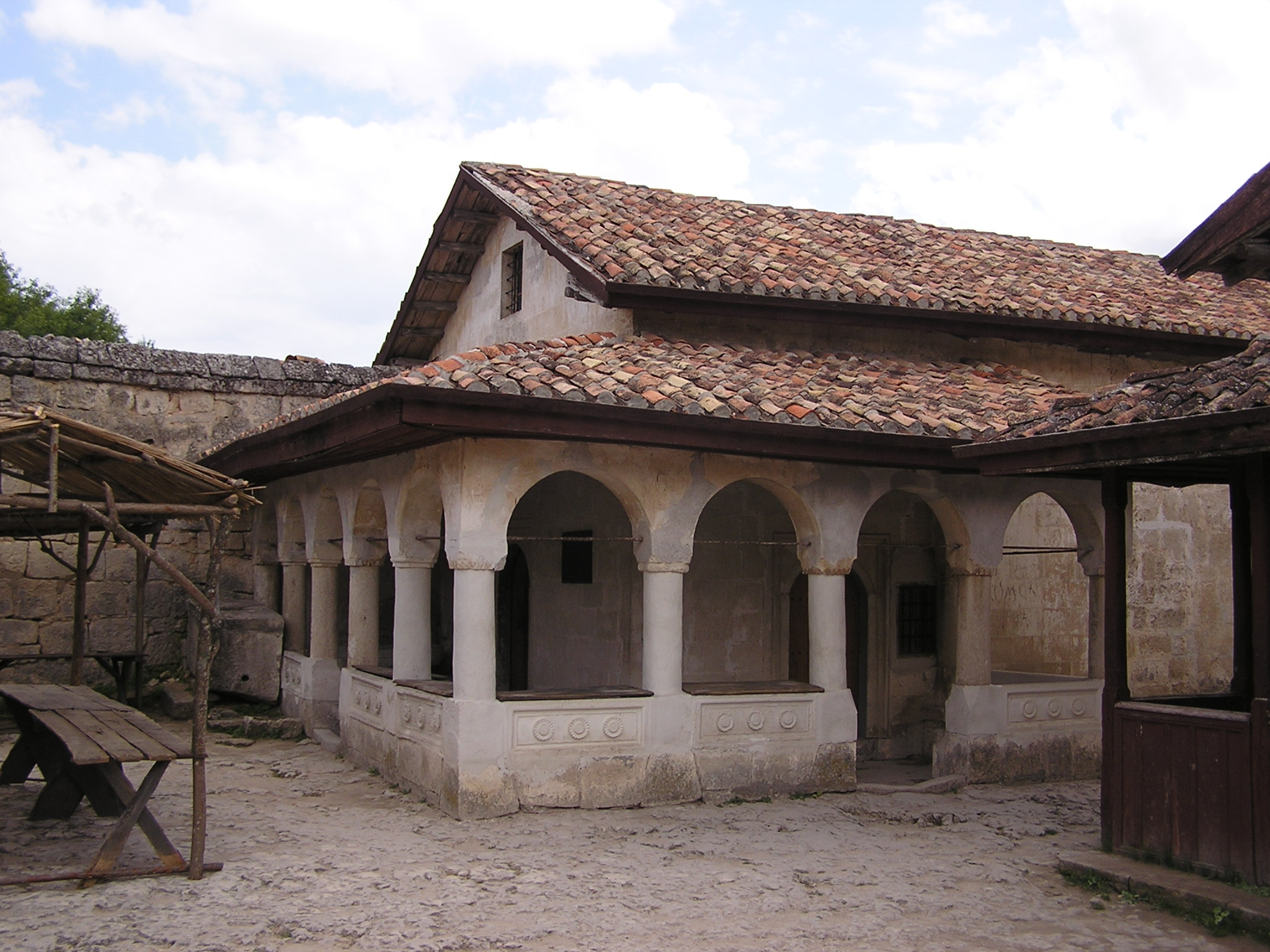
Chufut-Kale or Juft Qale in Karaim (Джуфт Къале), near Bakhchysarai, Crimea

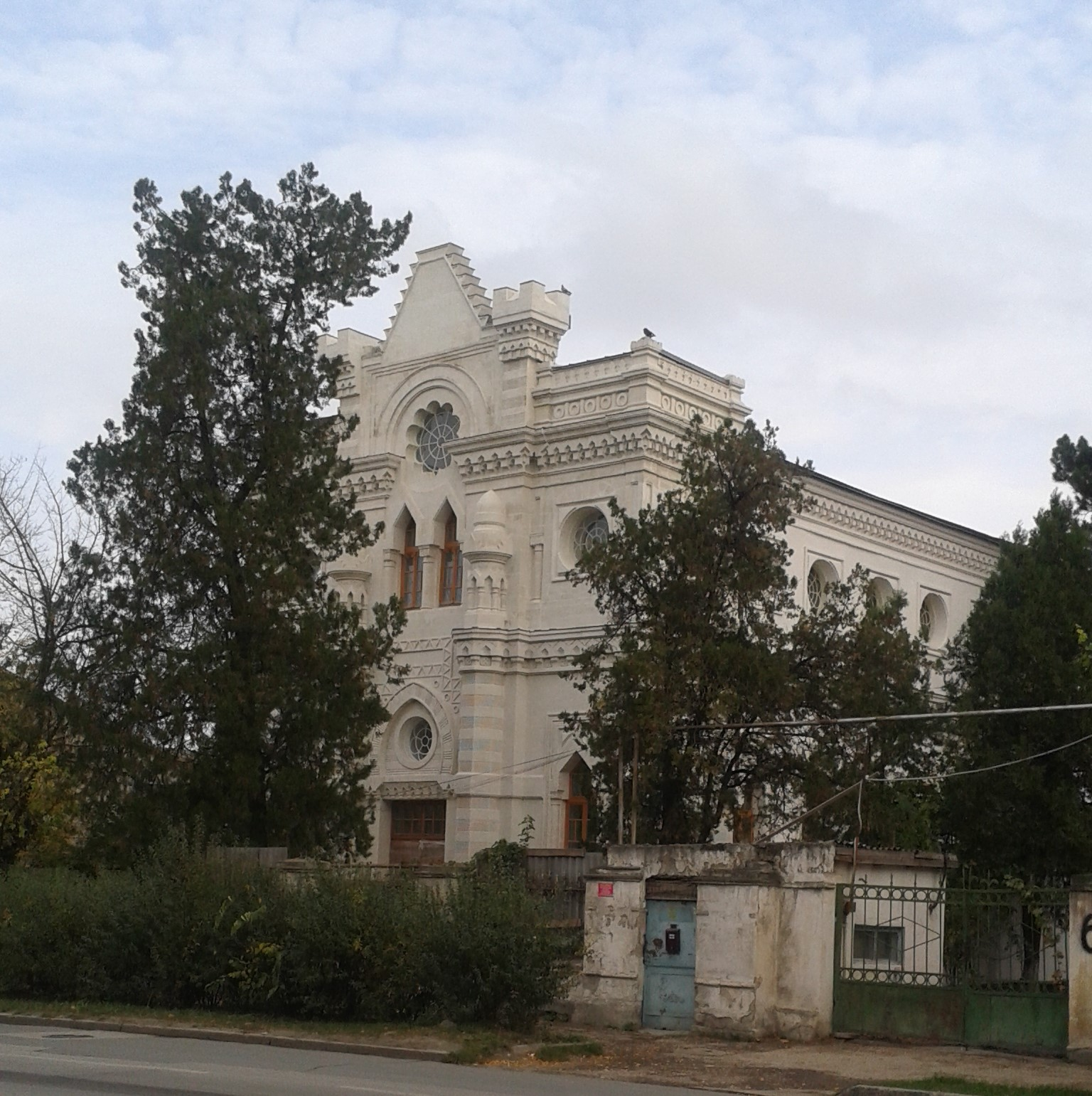
Simferopol, Crimea

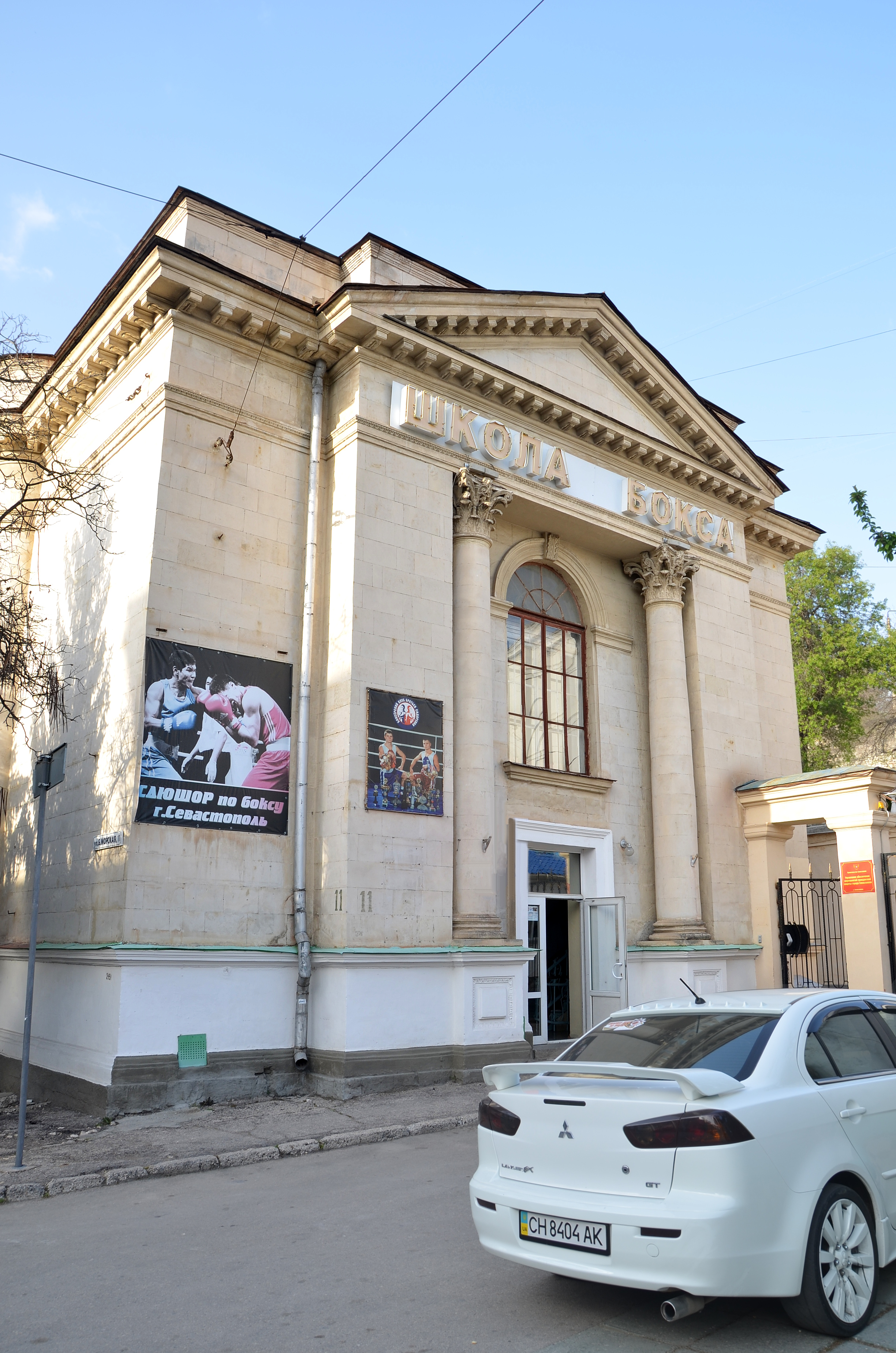
Karaite Kenesa, Sevastopol. Closed in 1931, is now used for sports school

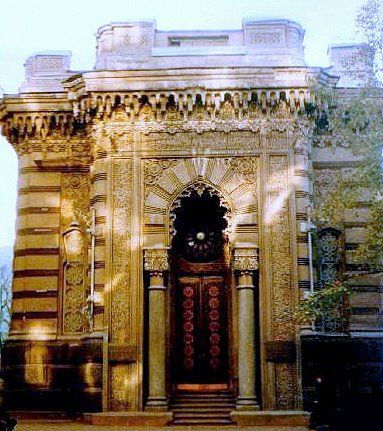
Karaite Kenesa by the architect Gorodetsky in Kyiv

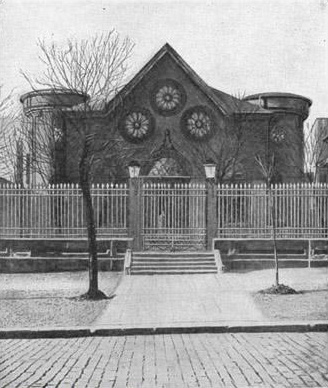
Odesa, Ukraine

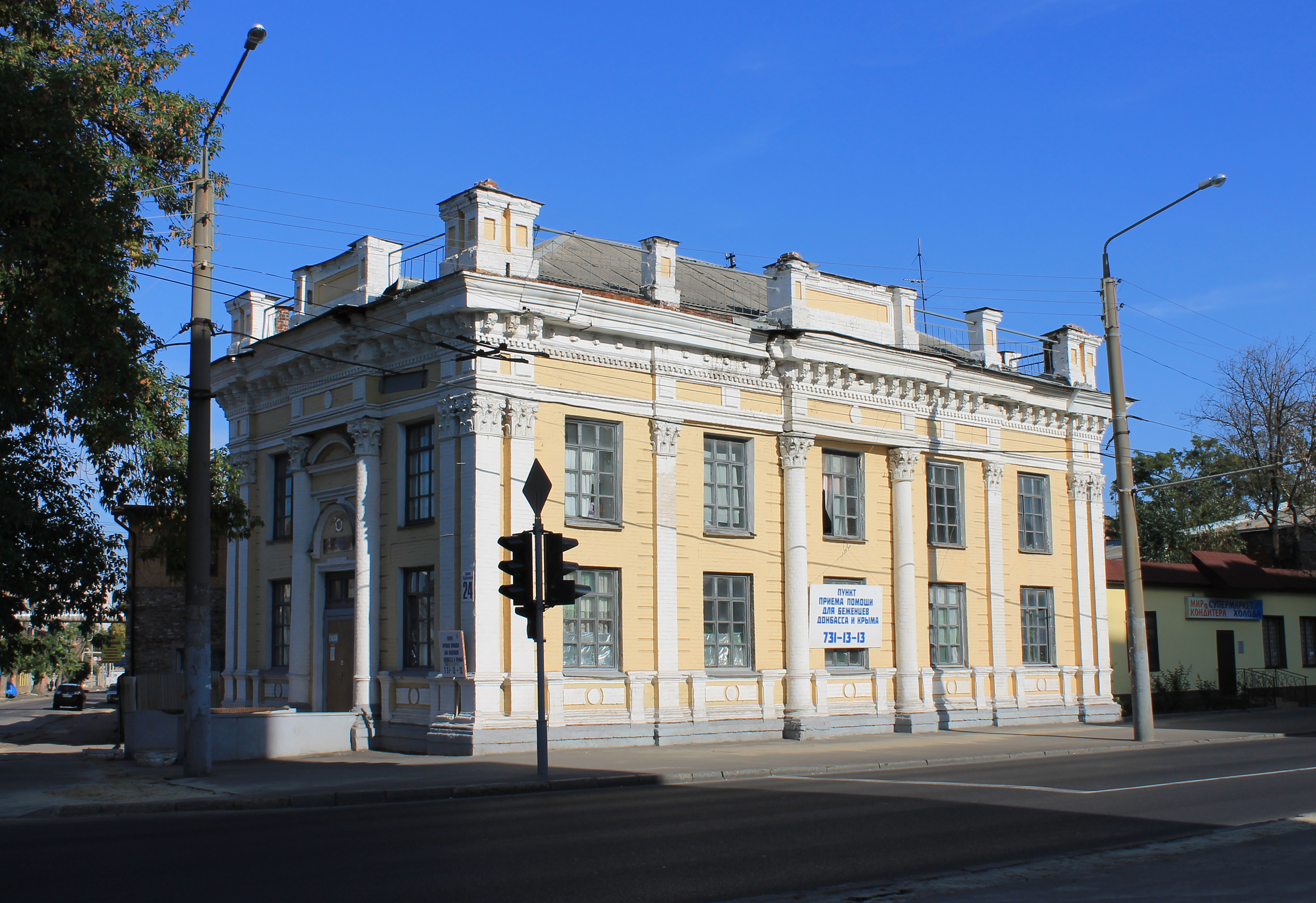
Kharkiv, Ukraine
