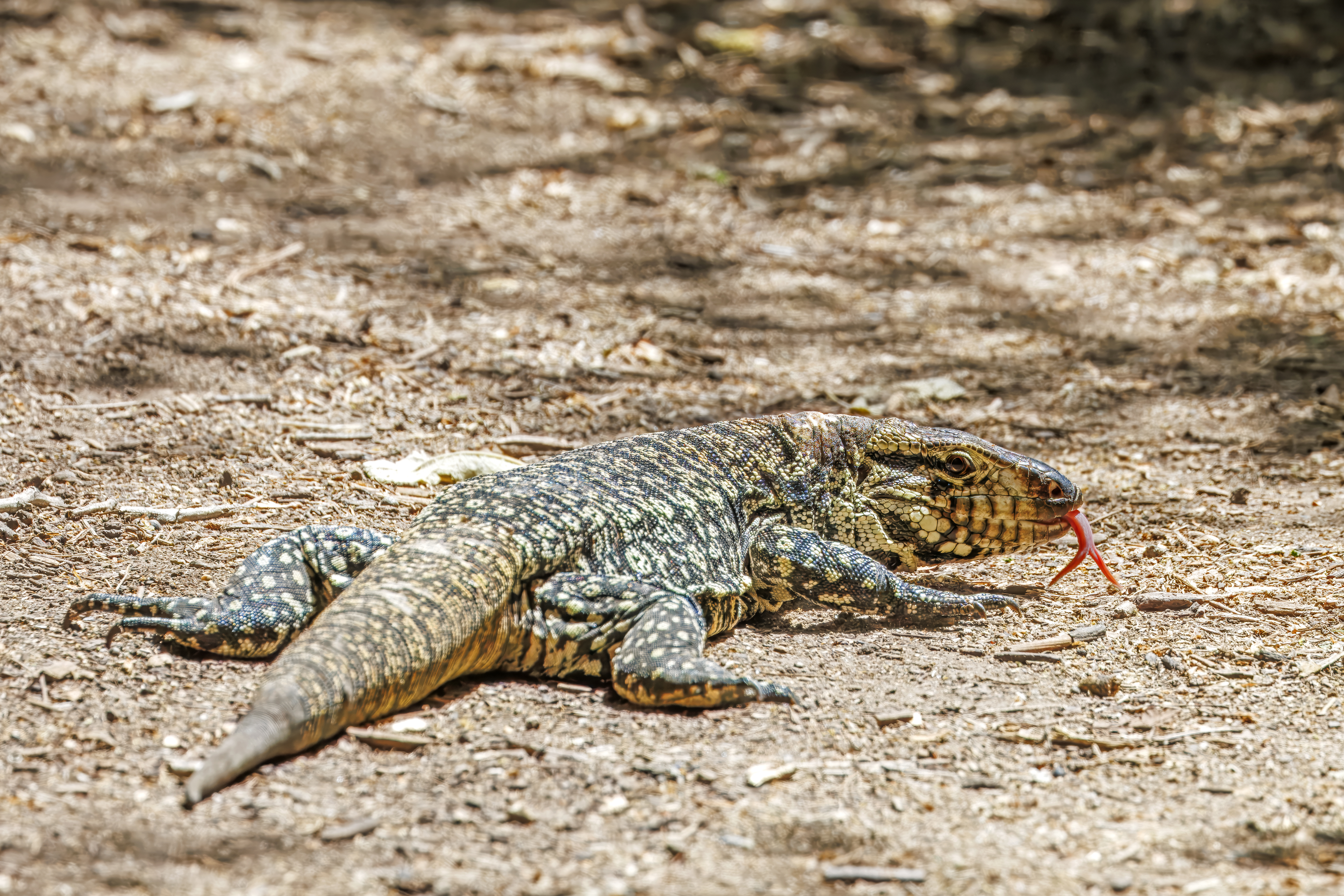
- Male
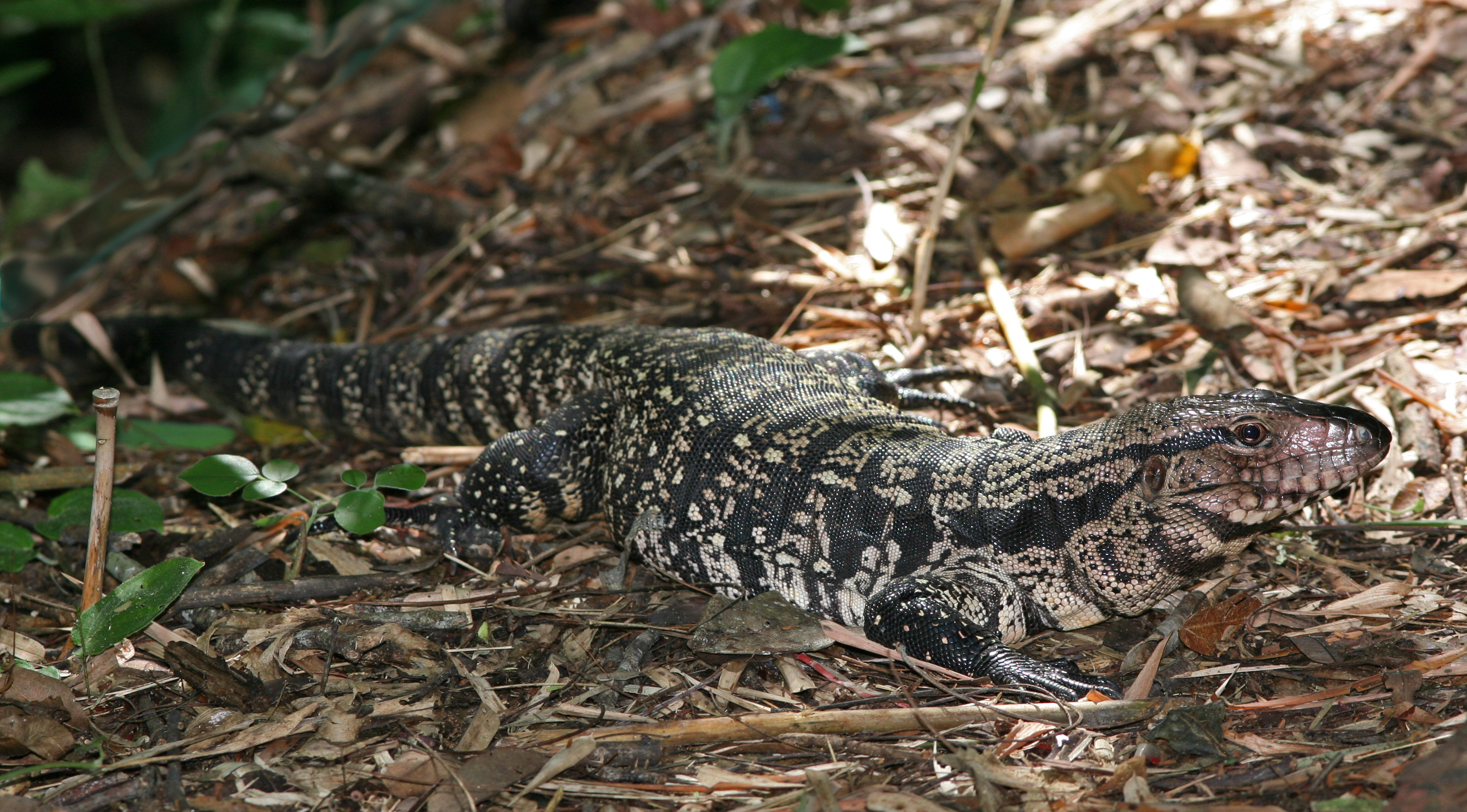
- Female

Conservation status
- Least Concern (IUCN 3.1)
- CITES Appendix II

Scientific classification
- Kingdom: Animalia
- Phylum: Chordata
- Class: Reptilia
- Order: Squamata
- Family: Teiidae
- Genus: Salvator
- Species: S. merianae

Binomial name
- Salvator merianae A.M.C. Duméril & Bibron, 1839
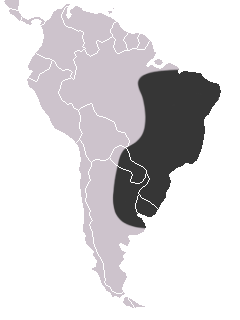

Synonyms
- List: Salvator merianae A.M.C. Duméril & Bibron, 1839; Teius teguixim — Gray, 1845; Tupinambis teguixin — Boulenger, 1885; Tupinambis merianae — Dirksen & De la Riva, 1999; Salvator merianae — Harvey et al., 2012

= Argentine black and white tegu =

Species of lizard

The Argentine black and white tegu (Salvator merianae), also commonly known as the Argentine giant tegu, the black and white tegu, the blue tegu, and the huge tegu, is a species of lizard in the family Teiidae. The species is the largest of the "tegu" lizards. It is an omnivorous species, which inhabits the tropical rain forests, savannas, and semideserts of eastern and central South America. It is native to south and southeastern Brazil, Uruguay, eastern Paraguay, Bolivia, and Argentina.

Tegu lizards are sometimes kept as pets, being notable for their unusually high intelligence and their relatively gentle nature. Like some reptiles, tegus enter brumation in autumn when ambient temperature drops. They exhibit a high level of activity during their wakeful period of the year. They are the only known nonavian reptiles to be partly endothermic during breeding season.

Tegus fill ecological niches similar to those of monitor lizards, but are only distantly related to them; the similarities are an example of convergent evolution.

== Taxonomy and etymology ==
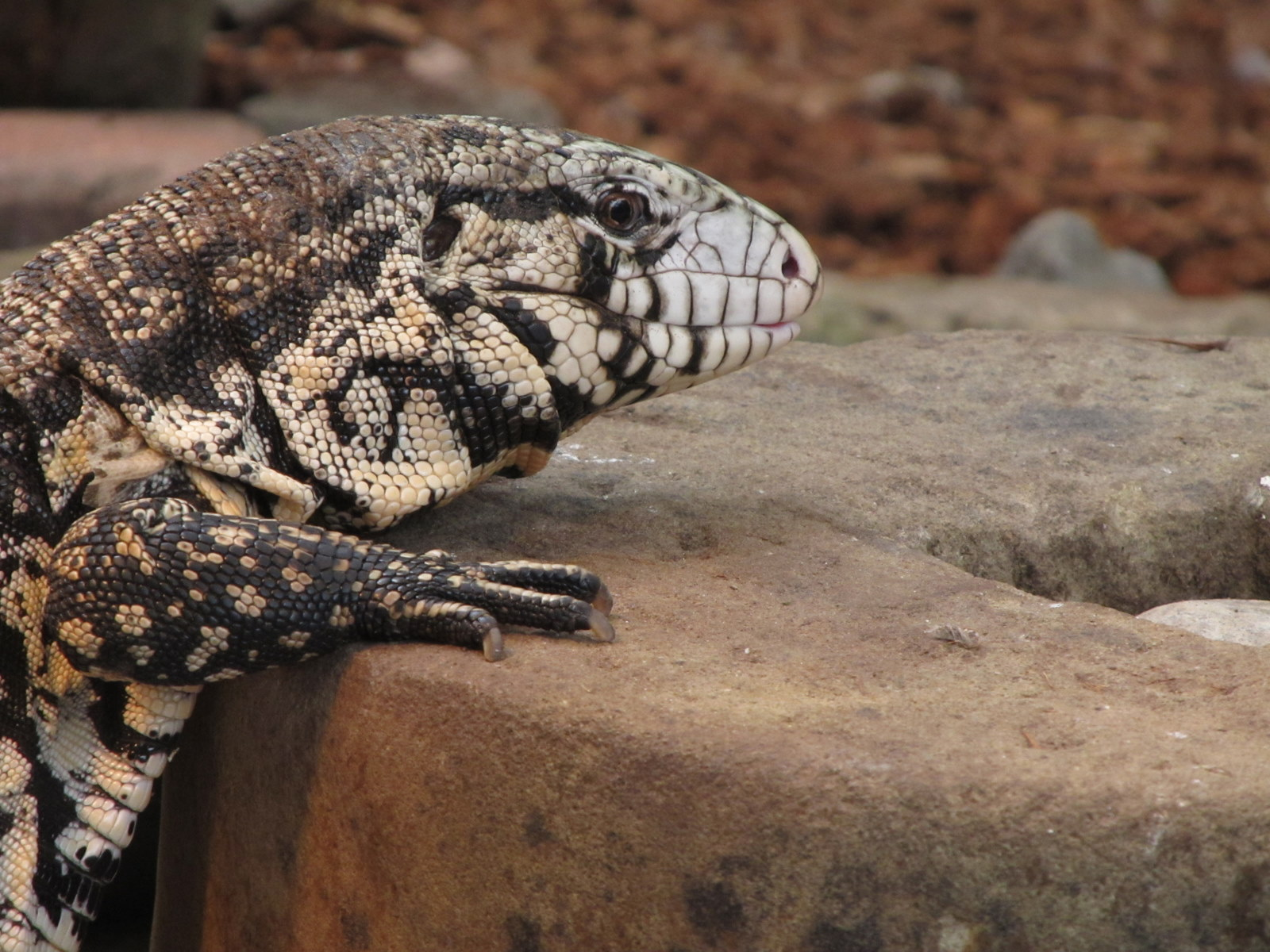
The two prominent loreal scales between the eye and nostril, alongside its round pupils, identify it as belonging to the genus Salvator.

The Argentine black and white tegu is a member of the family Teiidae, which also includes racerunners and whiptails. The term "tegu" refers to 9 genera within Teiidae (though new taxonomic classifications change), with the Argentine black and white tegu being assigned to the genus Salvator.

In 1839, this species of tegu was originally described as Salvator merianae. However, beginning in 1845 and continuing for 154 years, it was confused with Tupinambis teguixin and was considered a synonym of that species. In 1995, it was again given species status, as Tupinambis merianae because subsequent studies had shown that the gold tegu (Tupinambis teguixin) was distinct from it. In 2012, the Argentine black and white tegu was reassigned to the resurrected genus Salvator as Salvator merianae.

The genus Salvator can be distinguished from Tupinambis by the presence of two loreal scales between the eye and the nostril, as opposed to only one.

=== Etymology ===
The specific name, merianae, is in honor of German-born naturalist Maria Sibylla Merian, a naturalist and artist who studied insects, plants, and reptiles from the 17th to the 18th centuries.

S. merianae is called the "Argentine black and white tegu" to distinguish it from the "Colombian black and white tegu", which is another name for the gold tegu. Unscrupulous or incompetent pet dealers sometimes pass off gold tegus as Argentine black and white tegus.

=== Hybridization ===
In the ecotone between the arid Chaco and the Espinal of central Argentina, they are known to naturally hybridise with the red tegu (Salvator rufescens) with a stable hybrid zone.

== Distribution and habitat ==
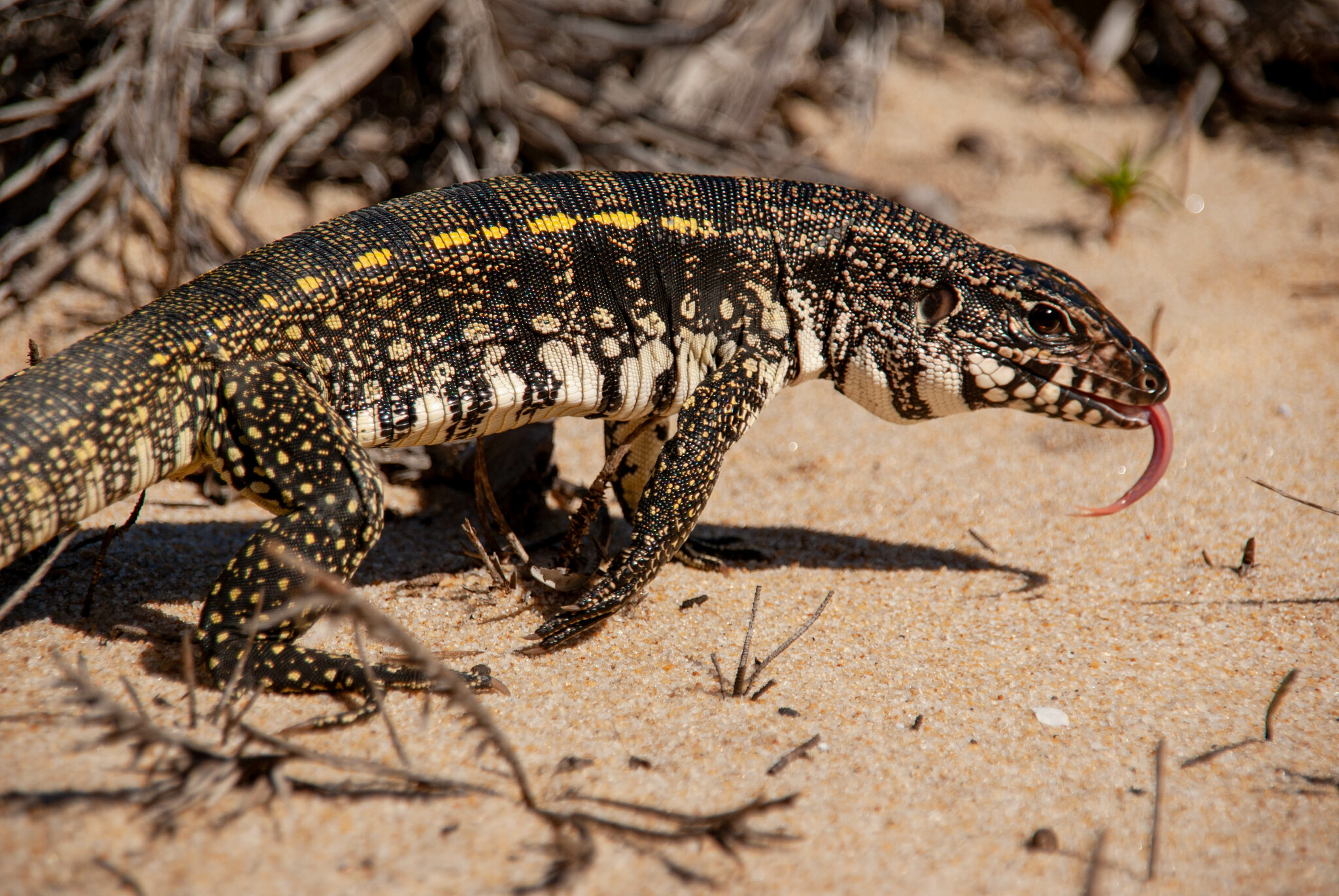
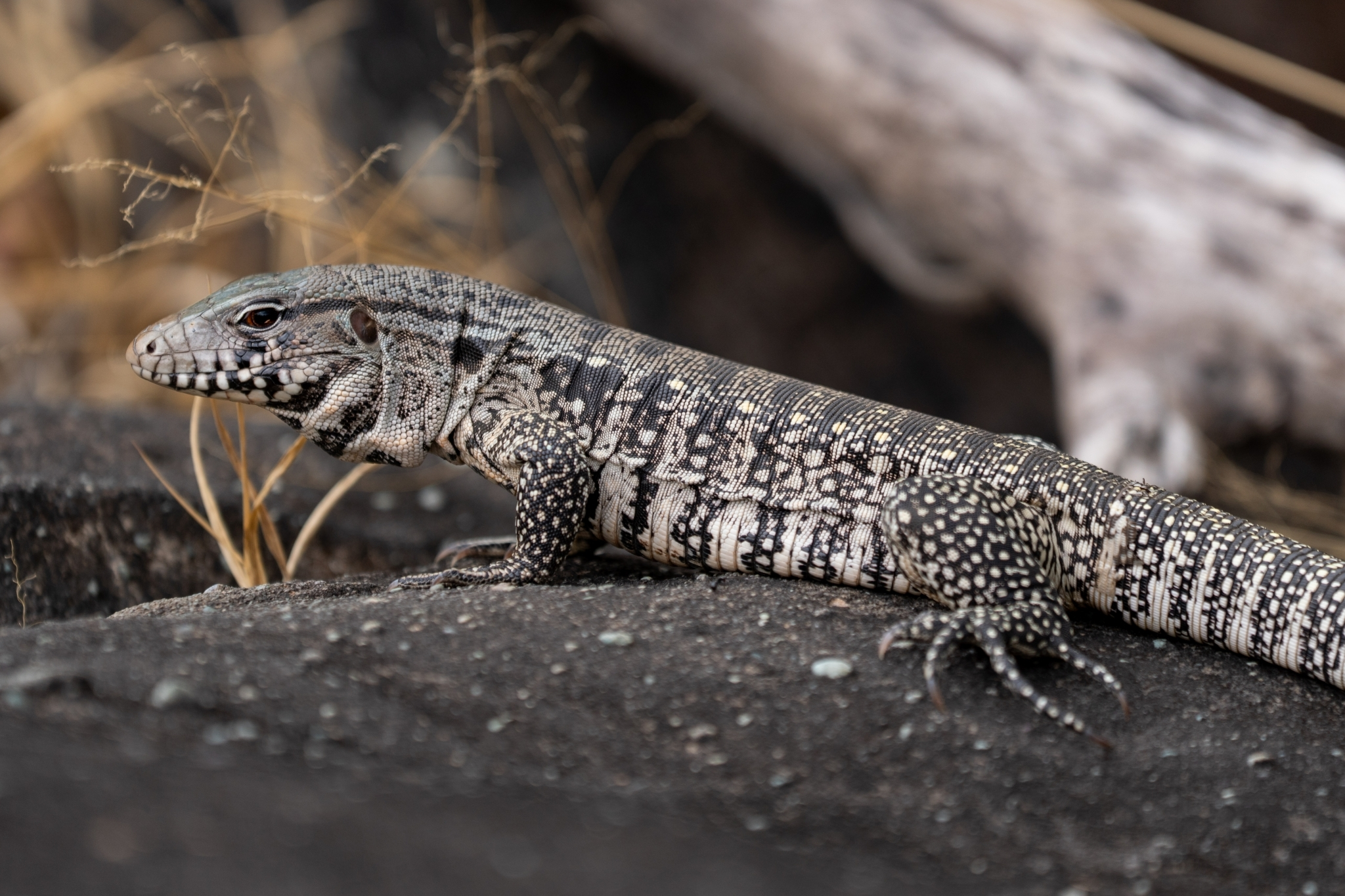
In Brazil, Rio de Janeiro (top) and Goiás (bottom)

As one of its common names would suggest, Salvator merianae is native to Argentina, but also to Brazil, Paraguay, Bolivia, and Uruguay.

Significant populations of Argentine black and white tegus occur in the southern United States and the Brazilian coast. They are a consistently problematic invasive species in Florida and Georgia, along with sightings in South Carolina, most likely as a result of escaped or released specimens from the early-2000s pet trade. Previous studies have found that the differing weather and climate patterns far outside of their natural habitat range do not prevent adult Argentine black and white tegus from surviving in diverse areas across the United States, furthering concerns about their invasive status. In the wild, tegus inhabit both forested and open-plain environments, widening their potential invasive range. The first evidence of a reproducing population of these tegus into southeastern Florida occurred when a female was tracked to her nest mound. One clutch of 21 eggs from the current year was found and one clutch of 22 hatched eggshells and 13 unhatched eggs was found from a past year. Established communities were identified in Hillsborough and Polk Counties in Florida.

Tegus have also been found in scrub and wet habitats such as flooded savannas, canals, ponds, and streams. They largely seem to not discriminate in habitat type as long as they have the ability to burrow.

== Description ==
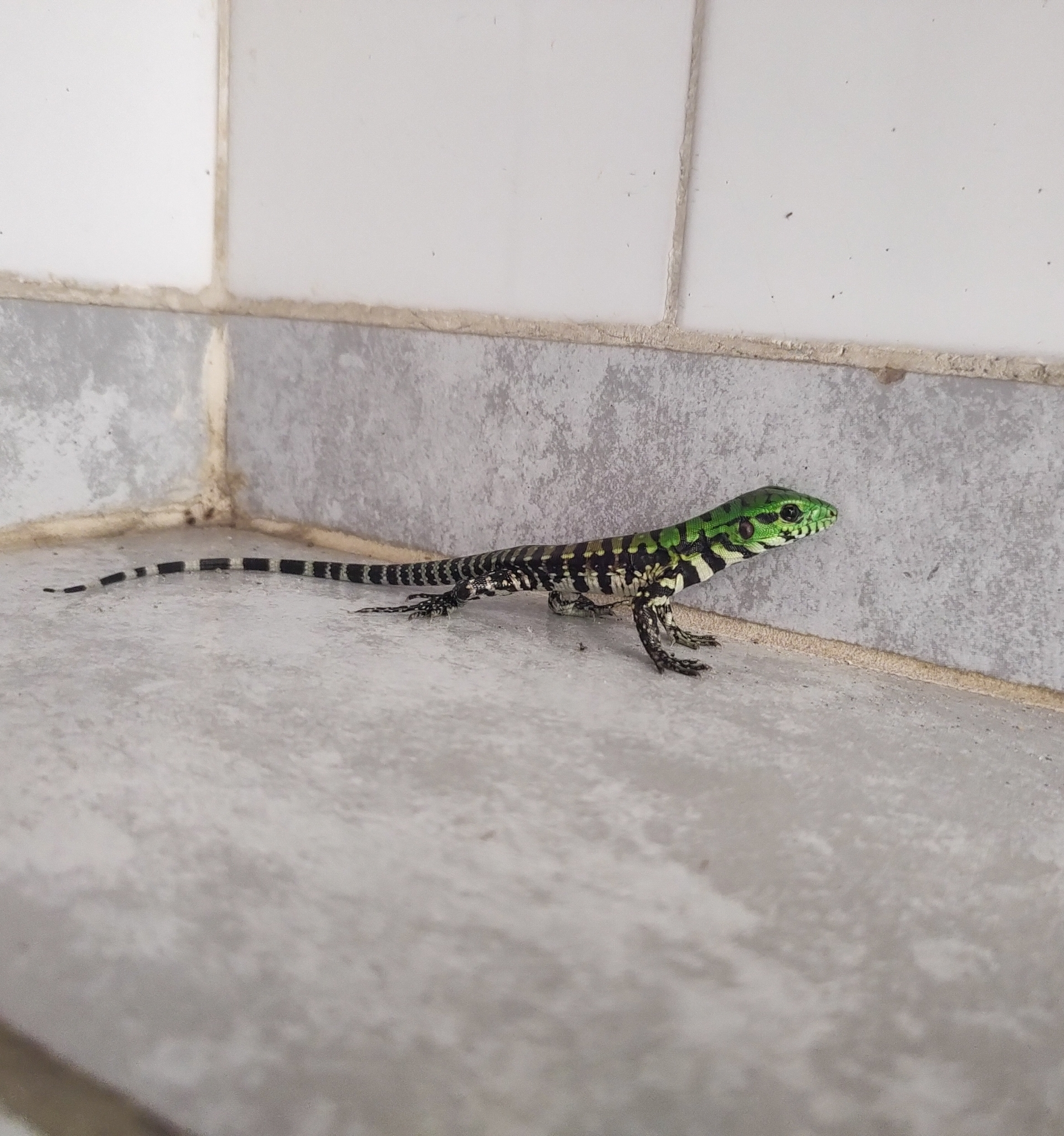
Hatchling, in Brazil

As a hatchling, Salvator merianae has an emerald-green color from the tip of its snout to midway down its neck, with black markings. The emerald green becomes black several months after shedding. As a young tegu, the tail is banded yellow and black; as it ages, the solid yellow bands nearest to the body change to areas of weak speckling. Fewer solid bands indicate an older animal. A tegu can drop a section of its tail as a distraction if attacked. The tail is also used as a weapon to swipe at an aggressor or potential predator. Capable of living 12 to 15 years in the wild, tegus could survive more than 20 years in captivity with excellent care.

The skull is heavily built with a large facial process of the maxilla, a single premaxilla, paired nasals, a single frontal bone, and two parietal bones separated by the sagittal suture. Biomechanical analyses suggest the posterior processes of the parietal might be important for dealing with torsional loads due to posterior biting on one side. In the large adults, the posterior teeth are larger and more rounded than the anterior teeth.

=== Sexual dimorphism ===
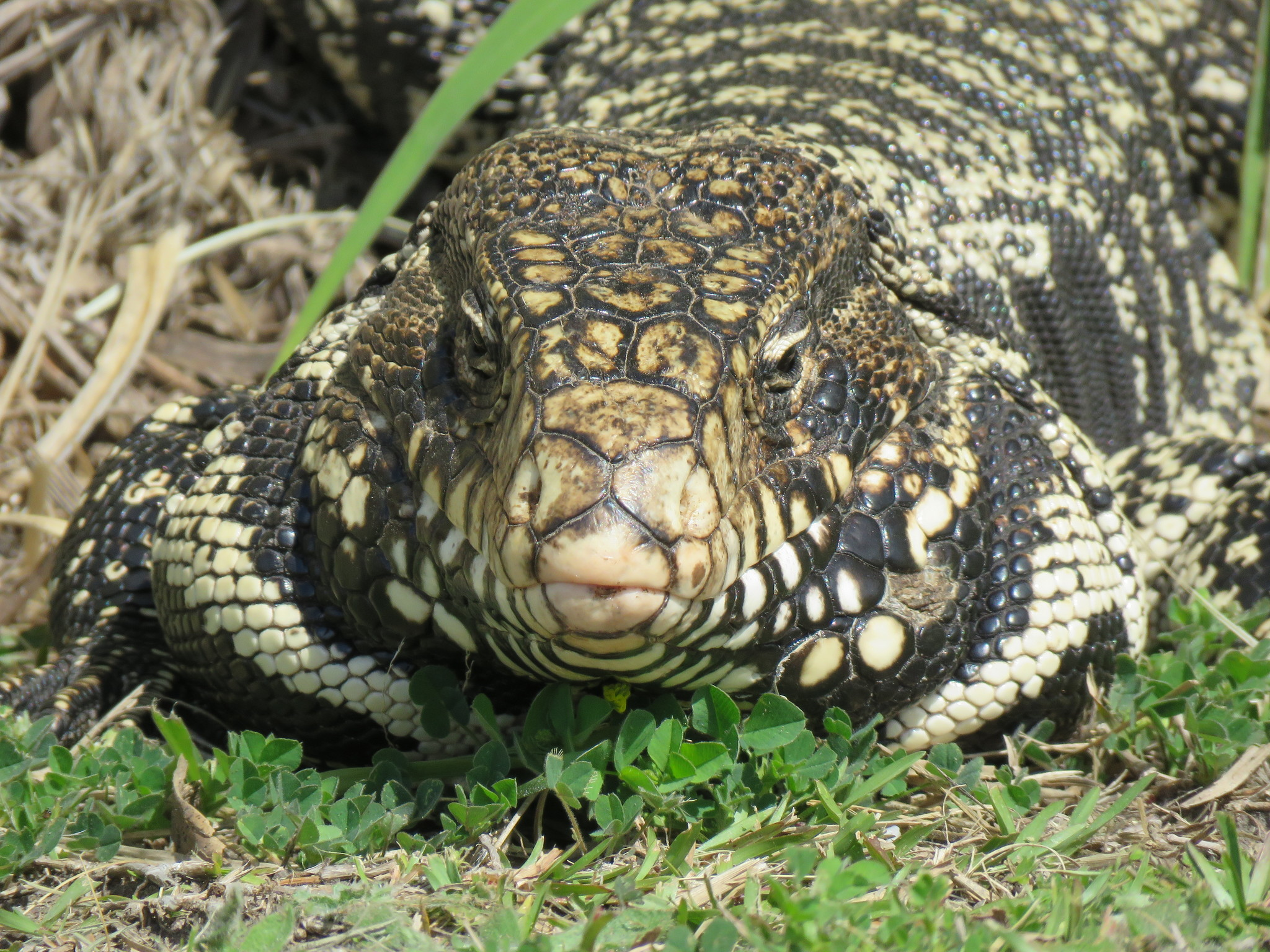
Males have large jowls. In Buenos Aires, Argentina

Adult males, much larger than the females, can exceed 120 cm (4 ft) in total length (tail included) at maturity. They may continue to grow to total lengths of 120–140 cm (4–4.5 ft).

The females are smaller, but may grow up to 100 cm (3 ft) in length from nose to tail tip. Adult females can reach a weight of 2.5–7.0 kg (5.5–15.4 lb).

When a tegu reaches the age of 8 months, its gender can easily be determined visually. The vent at the base of the tail bulges if it is a male, but lies flat if it is a female. In adults, the main difference is in the jowls. Males have substantially developed jowls as a result of hypertrophic lateral pterygoideus muscles. Females' jawlines are more streamlined.

== Ecology ==
=== Diet ===
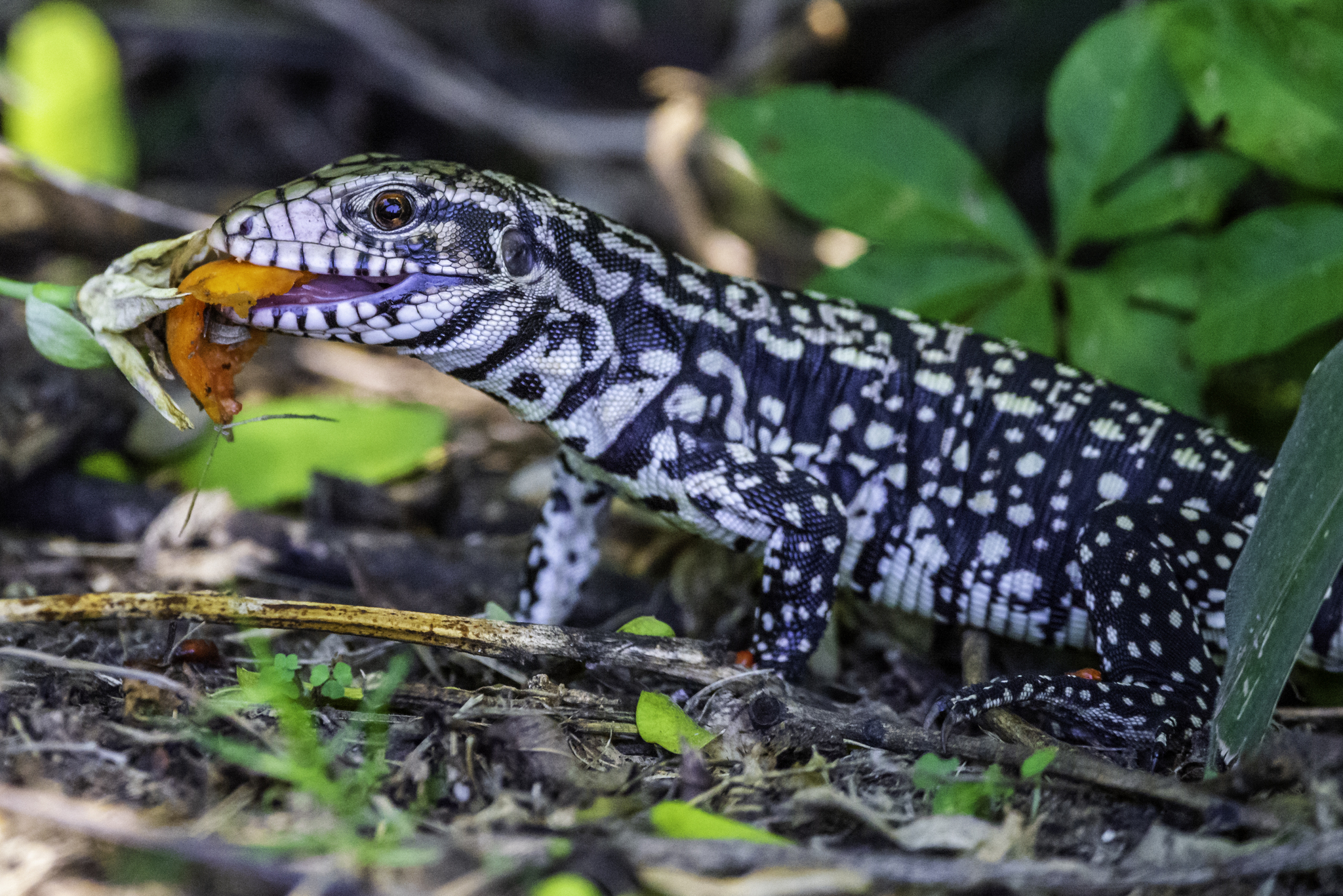
Juvenile eating fruit, in Buenos Aires, Argentina

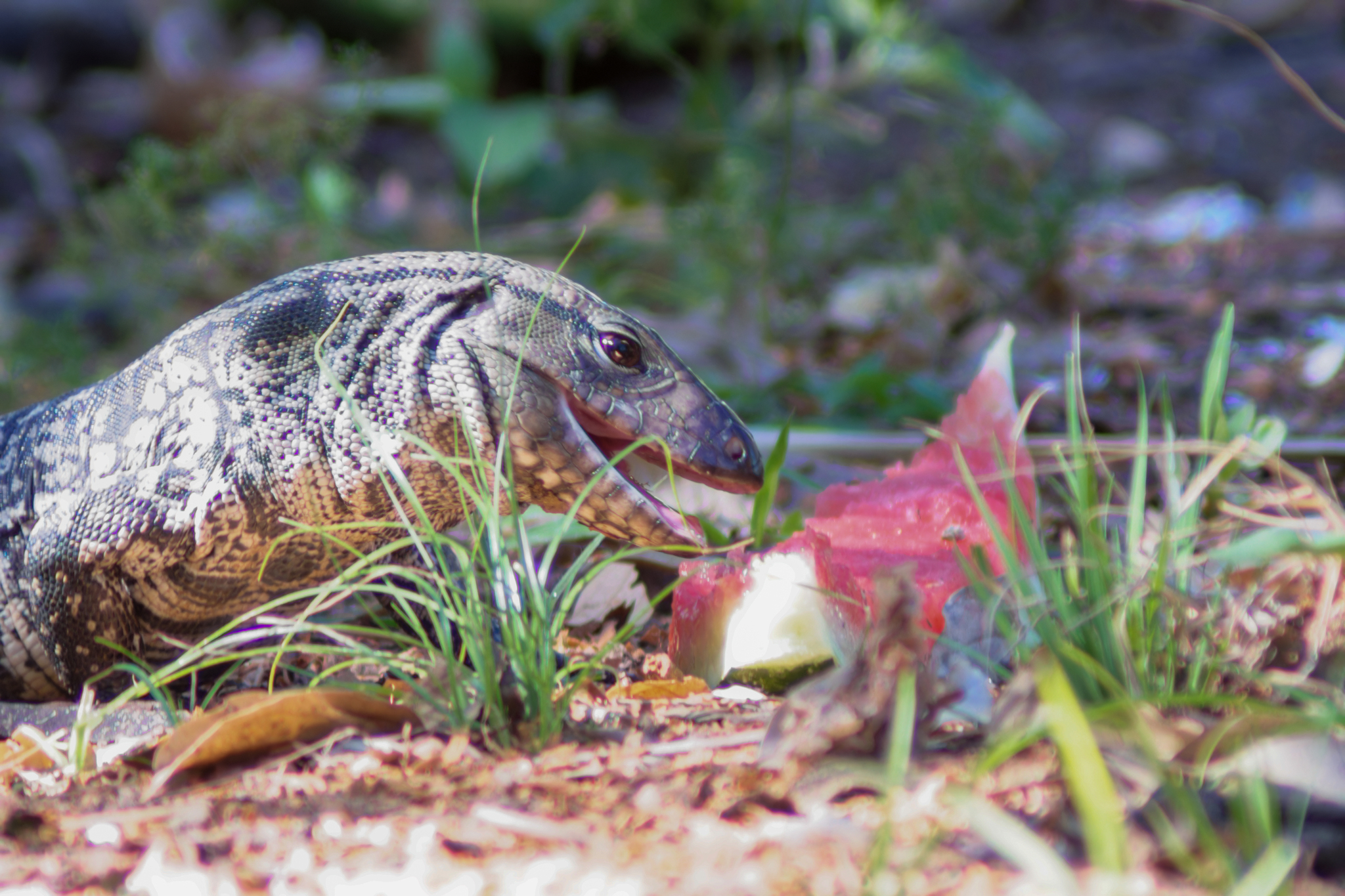
Eating watermelon, in Rio Grande do Sul, Brazil

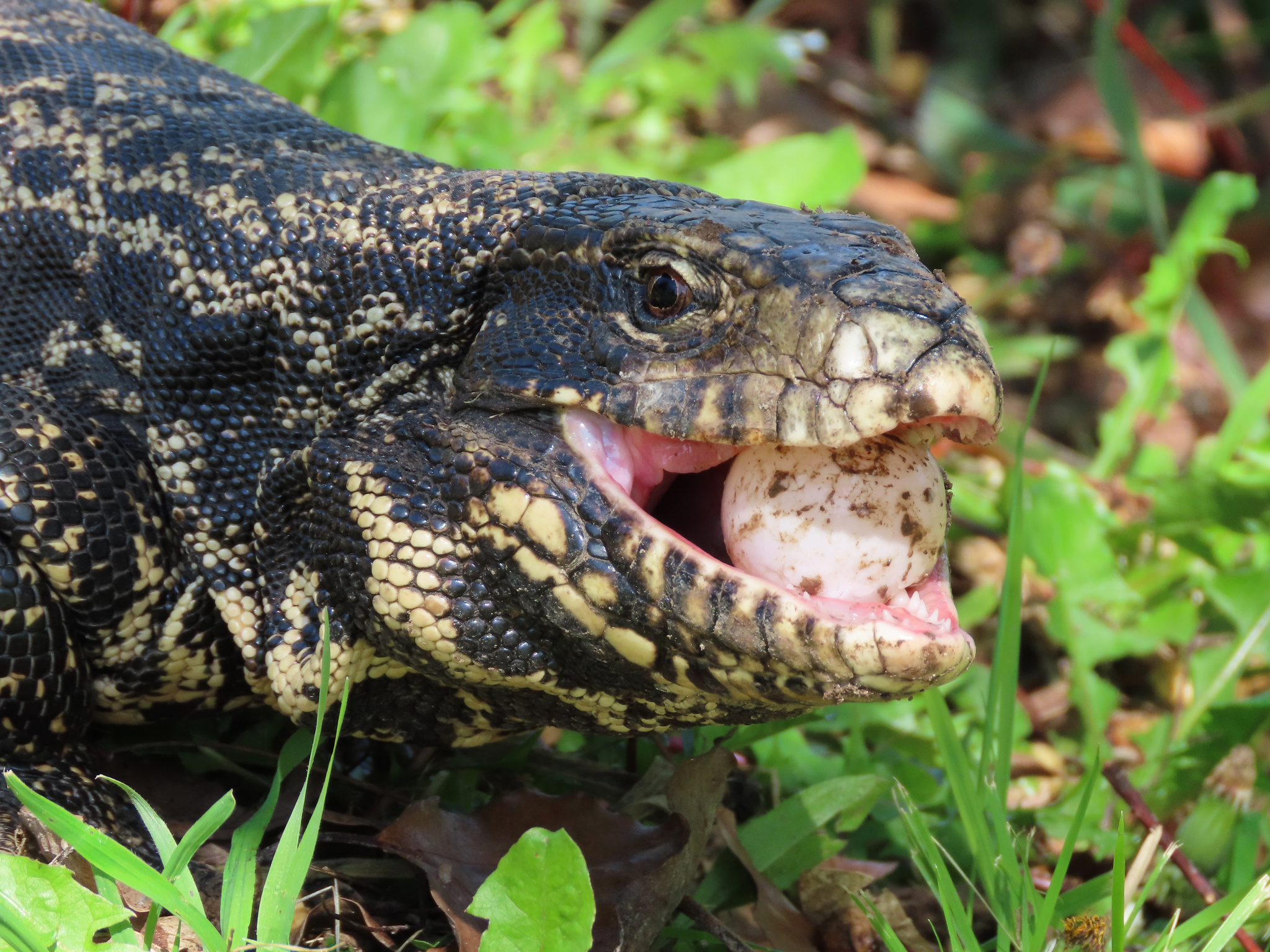
Eating an egg, in Buenos Aires, Argentina

Tegus are omnivorous; juveniles in the wild have been observed to eat a wide range of vertebrates, invertebrates, fruits, and seeds. A non-exhaustive list includes insects, annelids, crustaceans, spiders, snails, small birds, fish, frogs, other lizards, snakes, rodents, armadillos, bananas, grapes, mangoes, and papayas.

Tegus are notorious egg predators, seeking out eggs from the nests of birds and other reptiles. This makes them a concerning predator of sea turtles, alligators, and crocodiles as their invasive populations spread across the United States.

As adults, their plant consumption increases, but their diet varies by season, with small vertebrate prey being more common in the spring, while plants and invertebrates are more commonly consumed in the summer.

In captivity, tegus commonly are fed high-protein diets that include raw or cooked flesh, such as ground turkey, canned or dry dog food, commercial crocodile diet, chicken, eggs, insects, and small rodents. They are also fed various feeder insects, such as mealworms, superworms, earthworms, silkworms, crickets, and cockroaches. Some evidence indicates that cooking most of the egg in the diet is a good practice, so as to denature the protein avidin that occurs in the albumen. Raw avidin immobilises biotin, so excessive feeding of raw eggs may cause fatal biotin deficiency.

Like all lizards, these tegus need a properly balanced diet and the inclusion of fruit in the diet is recommended. Incomplete prey items such as insects or ground meat require dusting with a mineral/multivitamin supplement. Vitamin deficiencies can lead to trouble shedding skin, lethargy, and weight loss; a calcium deficiency can lead to metabolic bone disease, which can be fatal.

=== Mortality ===
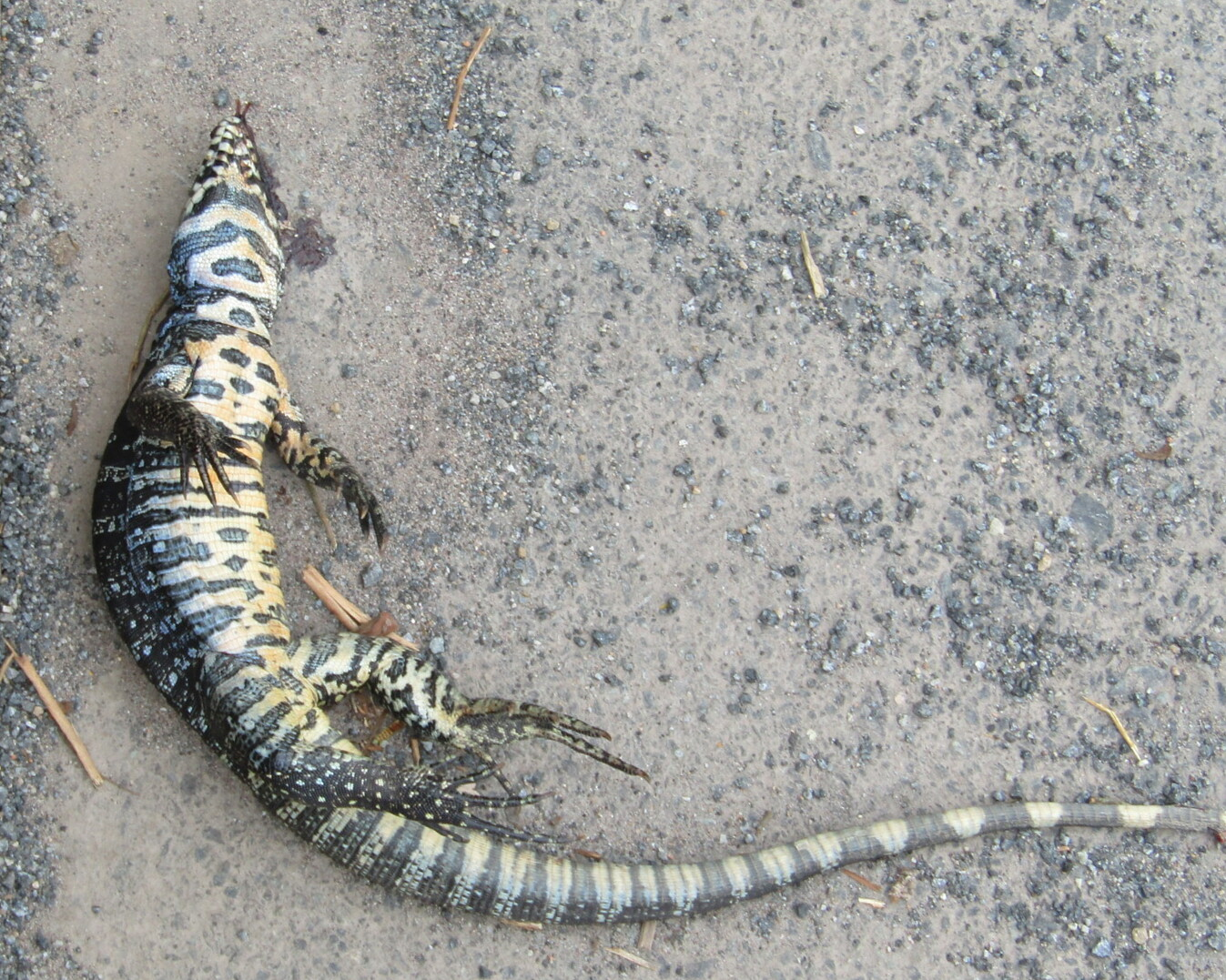
Roadkilled S. merianae showing ventral markings, in Santa Catarina, Brazil

Predators of tegus include cougars, jaguars, otters, snakes, caimans, and birds of prey. A known predator of the Argentine black and white tegu is the lesser grison (Galictis cuja), a mustelid related to weasels. Salmonella enterica was found in fecal samples from almost all S. merianae at a captive-breeding field station at State University of Santa Cruz, Ilhéus, Bahia, Brazil, illustrating the prevalence of Salmonella infection in tegus. Roads and vehicles pose a threat; it is one of the most frequently road-killed reptile species in its native range.

== Life cycle ==
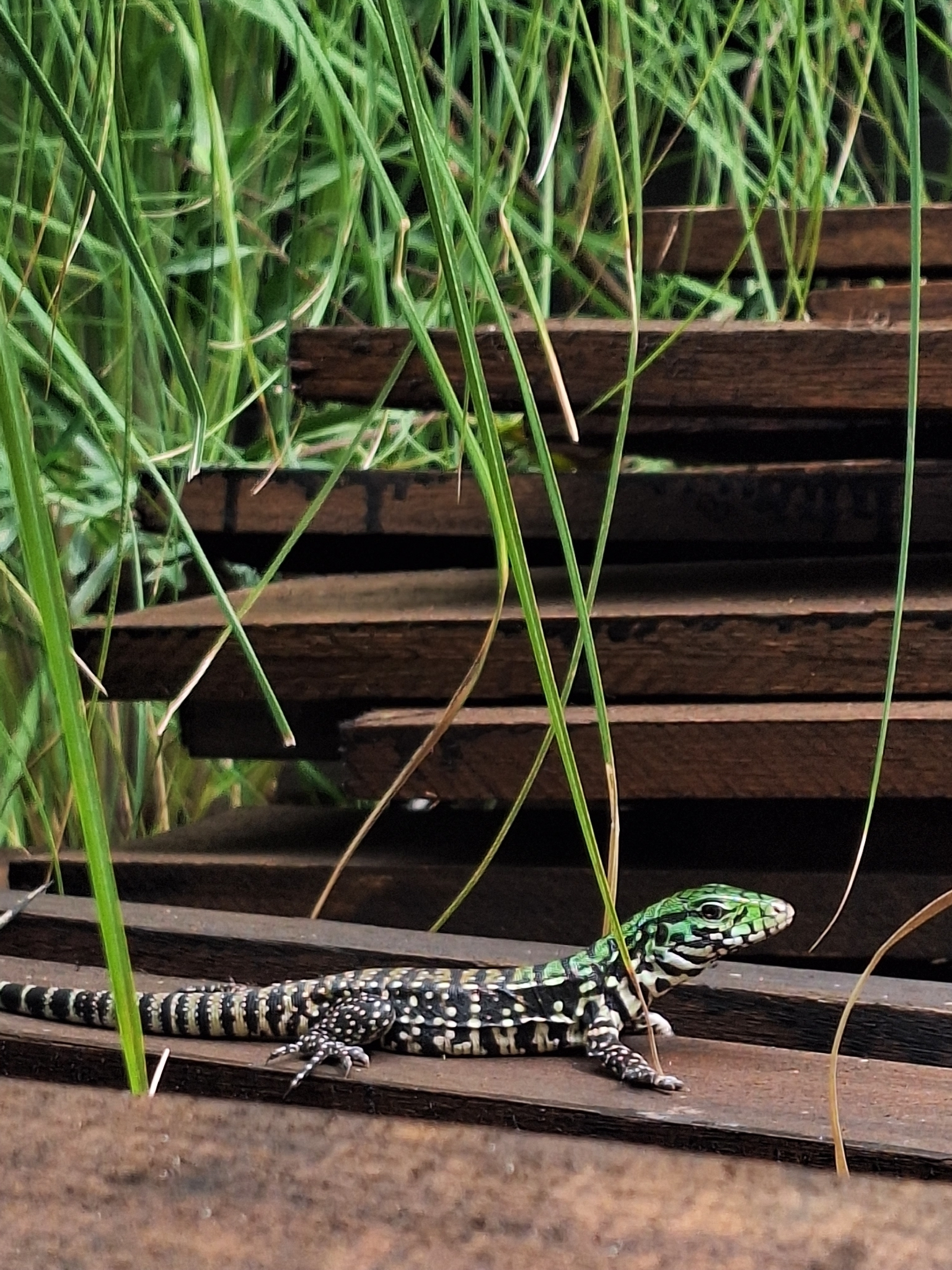
Young juvenile, in Buenos Aires, Argentina

Eggs of the Argentine black and white tegu usually hatch at the beginning of spring. Each hatchling weighs about 10 g (0.35 oz) and grows to 8 kg (18 lb) within four or five years, experiencing a nearly 800-fold increase in body size. During this time, its diet changes from insects to small vertebrates, eggs, carrion, and fruits. It is reproductively mature by its third year, when it weighs around 1.5 kg (3.3 lb), and ceases growing by around its fourth year, with the highest growth rate being its first and second years of life. S. merianae also experiences a seasonal lifecycle that begins within its first year, being very active during hotter months and in a brumation state in the colder months. Regardless of the season, the Argentine tegu does not experience any significant fluctuations in metabolism or body mass, which means its sensitivity to temperature underlying its metabolic rate does not change body mass. This differs from other endotherms and further explains the tegu's alternating endothermic and ectothermic behavior.

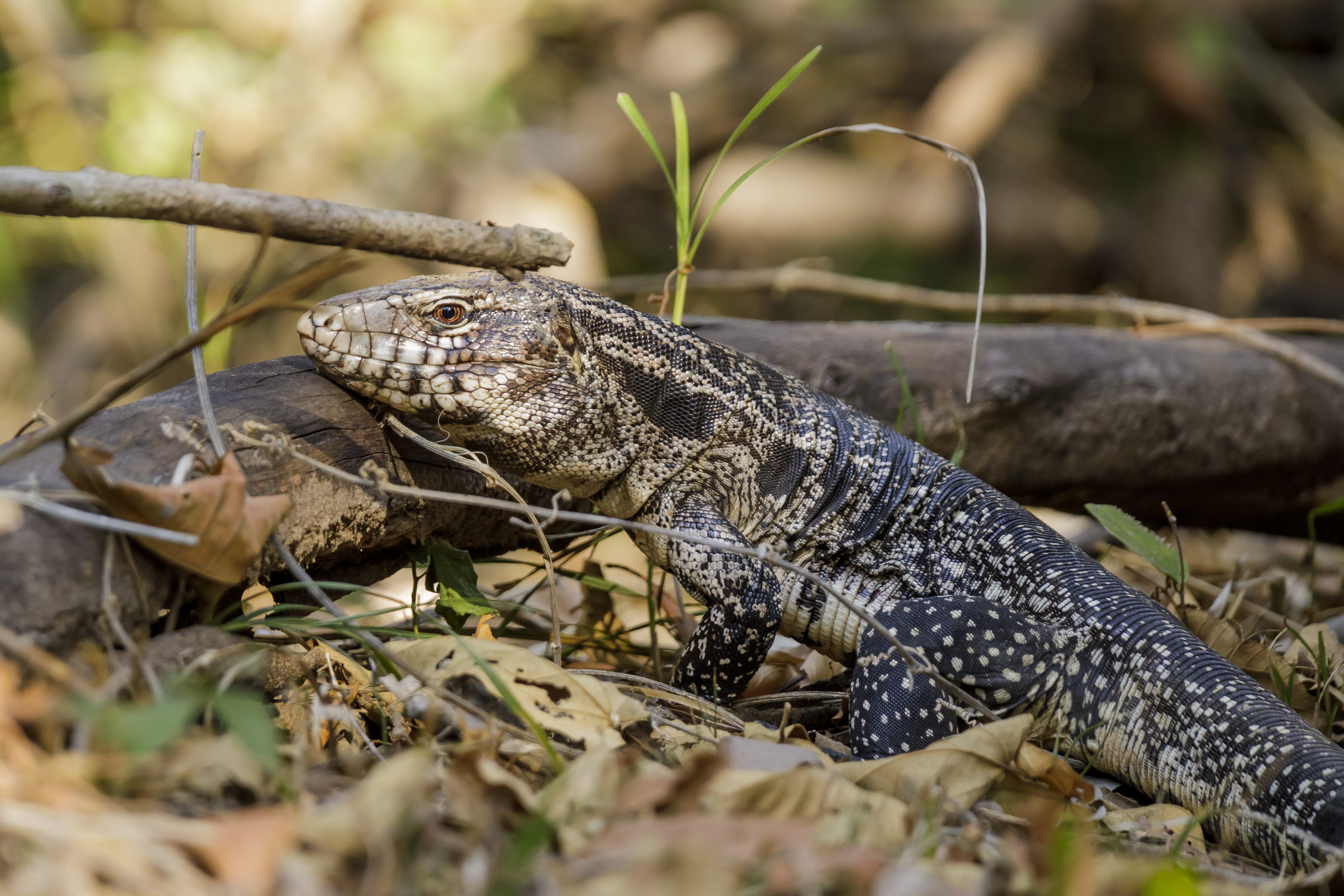
In Mato Grosso, Brazil

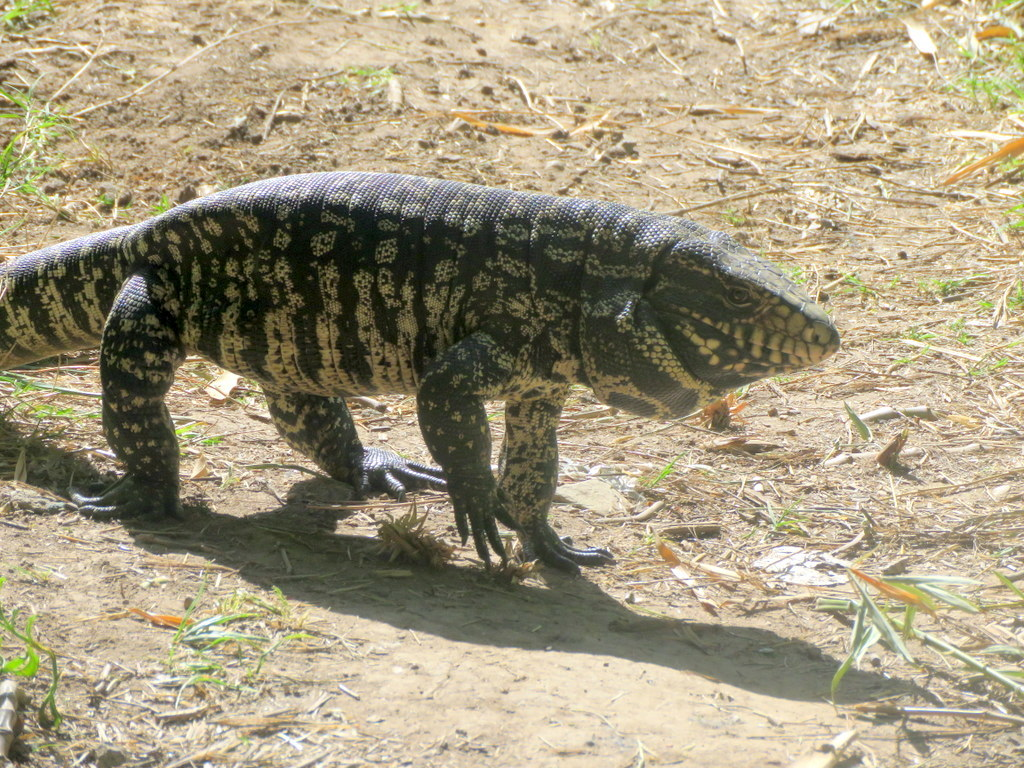
In Buenos Aires, Argentina

Brain vesicles (constructed from two neural tube constrictions) that make up the anterior forebrain, midbrain, and posterior hindbrain are developed and distinguishable from day three of embryonic development. On day four, visceral arches (consisting of mesenchymal tissue condensation and separated by grooves) form and are fully grown and fused by day nine. Day four also marks the development of limbs as small swellings. Its hindlimb development (developing claws faster than the forelimb) is more similar to crocodile or turtle embryonic development than other lizards. This alludes to the hindlimbs having greater functionality in tegu adults. Pigmentation is the last morphological structure to form and occurs late in development after other distinguishing characteristics have already been formed (such as scales). Pigmentation is observed from day 39 first on the dorsal portion of the head and body. It later extends down to the proximal and distal portions of the limbs by day 45 and extends down to the flanks by day 48. As development advances, the pattern begins to show lateral stretch marks by day 51. Pigmentation of the ventral portion of the body occurs between days 57 and 60, characterized by individualized spot patterns. Paired genital tubercles manifest in both sexes (called hemipenes in males). Reptile embryo development involves separate processes of differentiation and embryo growth. Differentiation is determined by external morphological features and is documented early. As the embryo approaches hatching, development stages are categorized into periods rather than ages (characterized by parameters of development speed).

== Behavior ==
=== Aggression ===
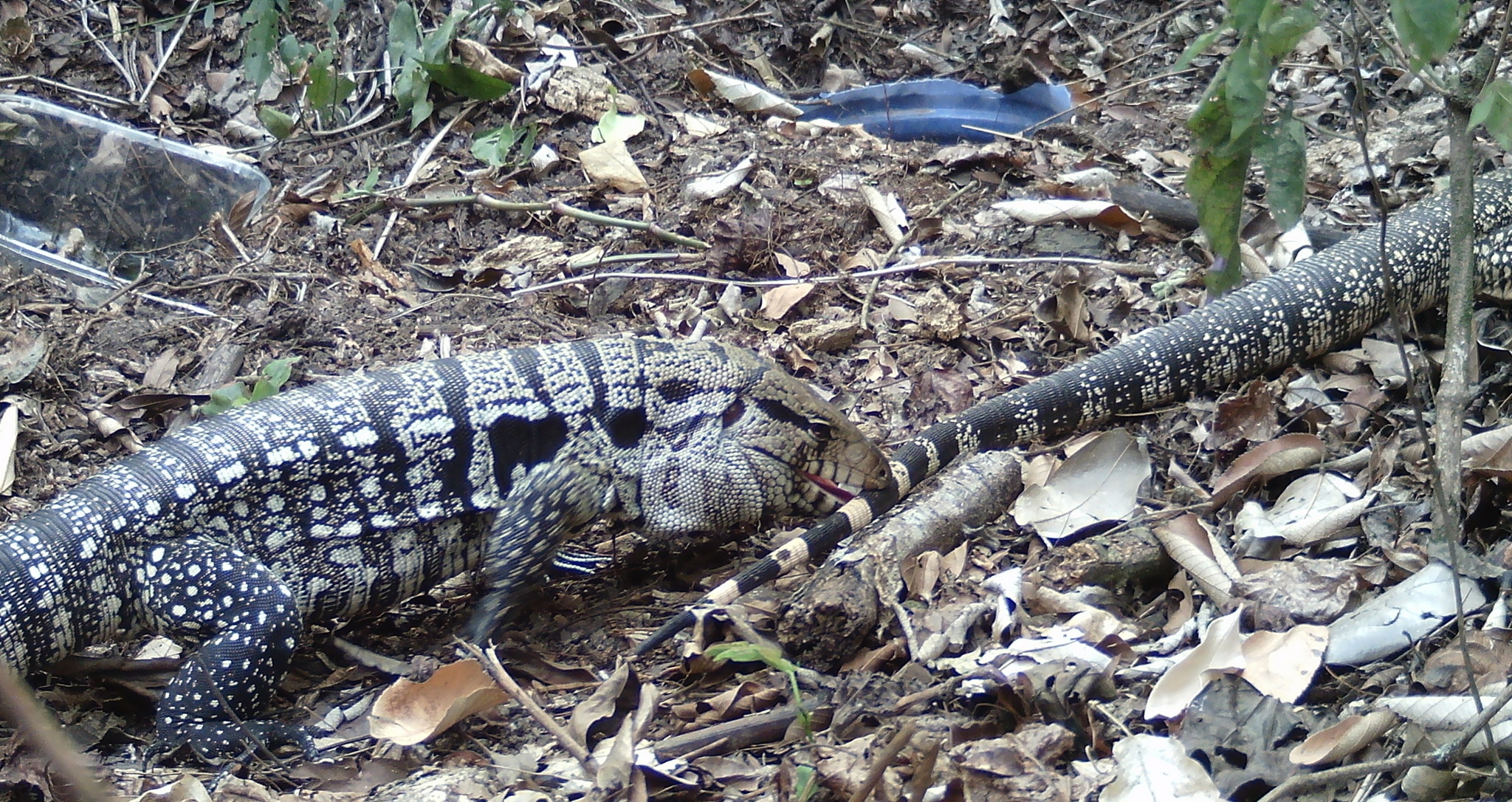
Tail biting, in São Paulo, Brazil

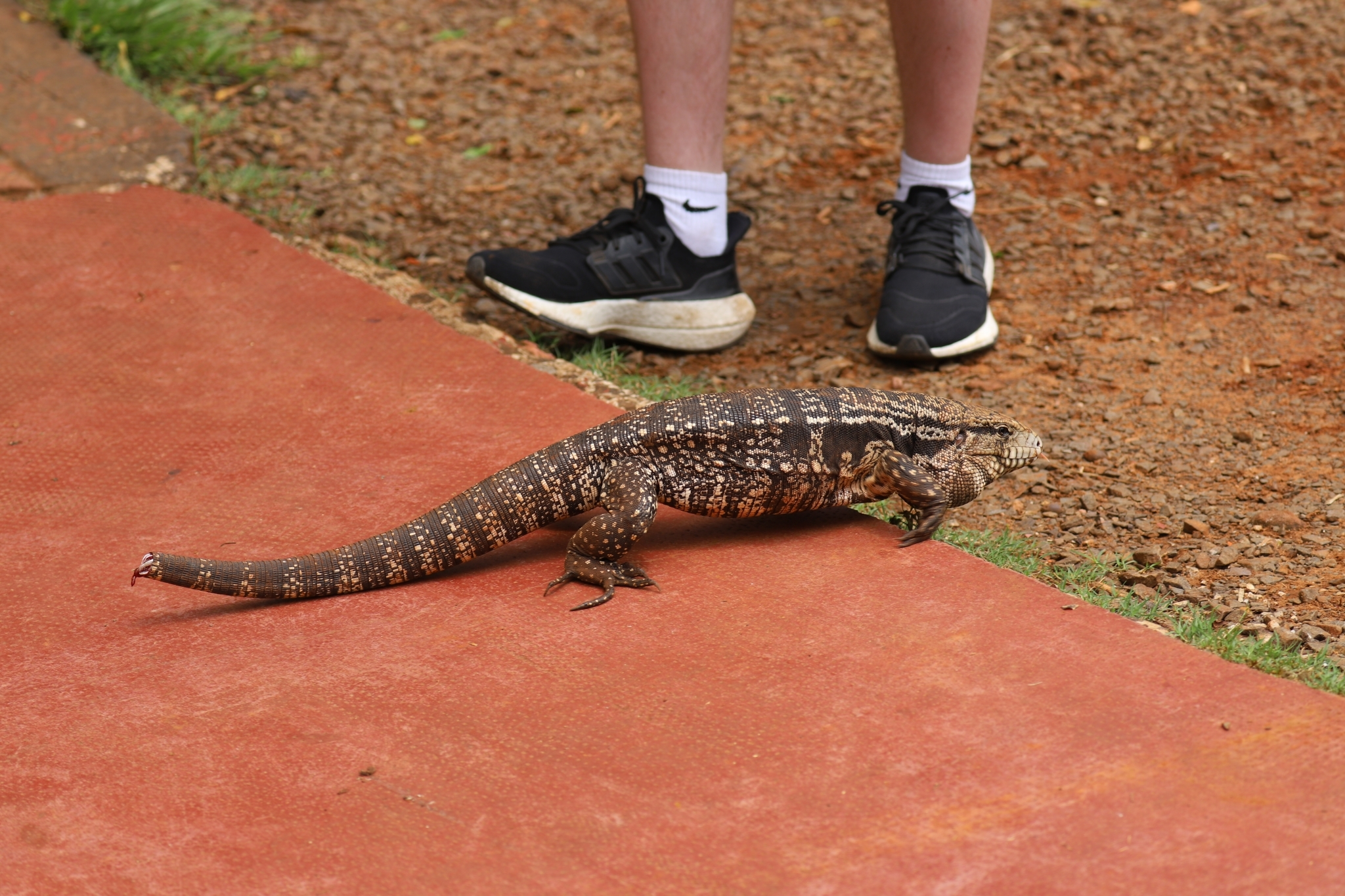
Male after just dropping part of its tail after being bitten by a male conspecific, in Misiones, Argentina

Aggression is a vital facet to animal behavior, as it provides advantages to survival when resources are limited. For the Argentine tegu, the physical performance of its aggressive behavior (i.e. biting) tends to be hindered by its large size. Regardless of sex, tegus with higher bite force are more aggressive to potential threats. Those with a higher bite force exhibit fewer escape responses and tend to be slower, displaying a tradeoff in fight or flight abilities, but also have the advantage of minimizing risk of injury by reducing the threshold for engagement in an aggressive encounter. This fight or flight tradeoff is more commonly observed in mammals rather than reptiles, and may be present in tegus because of an increase in head mass (correlated to stronger biting behavior) which makes maneuvering quickly difficult. In their home territories, Argentine tegus are generally less aggressive (less likely to display arching behavior) and are less likely to attempt escape regardless of size or bite force.

=== Reproduction ===
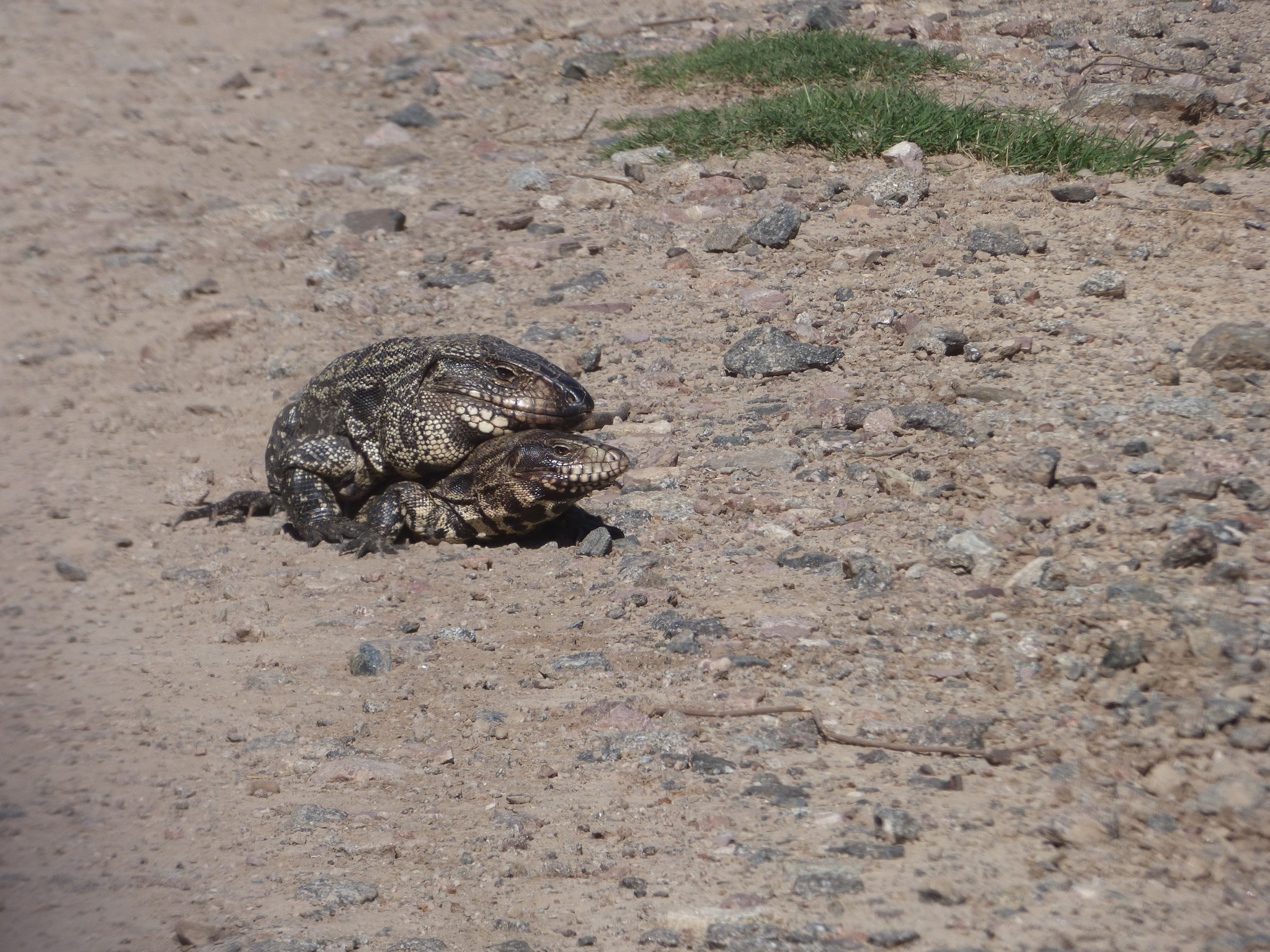
Mating, in Santa Fe, Argentina

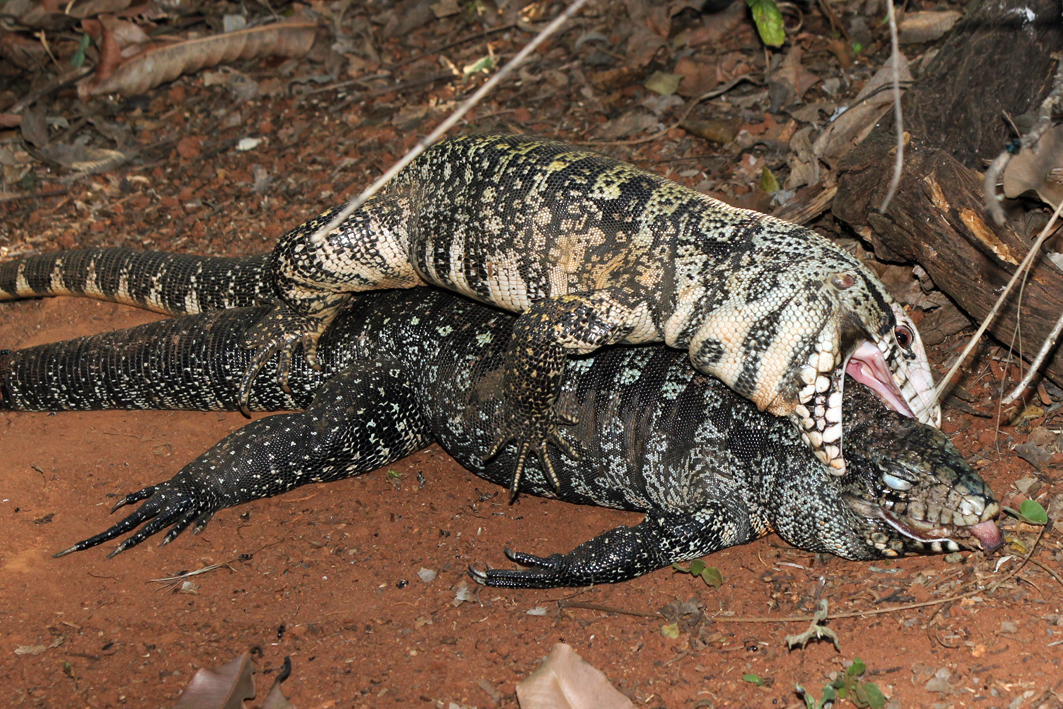
Male mating with a dead female in São Paulo, Brazil. Like many species of lizards, necrophilia has been recorded in the species.

Squamate reptiles such as snakes and lizards tend to rely on chemical cues to search for potential mates in their environments. A study using skin lipids indicates chemical cues can be used to modify movements of invasive reptiles in their non-native range, which could be useful in management strategies. The Argentine black and white tegu exhibits similar behavior, such as a marked "pausing and turning" as they trail in the spring. In particular, female tegus exhibit stronger trailing behavior than males, following scent trails more intensely and expressing a more sensitive response to mating-specific chemical odors. They also exhibit more decisive behavior, demonstrating a common vertebrate trend of female reproduction being the defining factor in influencing population size. Knowledge of this behavior is currently being explored as a strategic avenue to inhibit the current rise of the tegu as an invasive species. Prioritizing the removal of female tegus from the environment can potentially be a more effective way to curb these invasive populations. Tegus are a burrowing species in both their native and invaded habitats, especially during the winter. They mate during the spring after hibernating when their mating hormones are at their peak. During the spring, male Argentine tegus exhibit scent-marking behaviors such as delineating territory with gland scents.

Blue tegus, like other tegus, may breed up to twice a year. They lay between 18 and 25 eggs in a clutch, sometimes more, dependent upon animal size and husbandry, as well as the individual health of the gravid female.

During maternal seasons, female Argentine black and white tegus build nests out of dry grass, small branches, and leaves to maintain optimal temperature and humidity levels. Egg incubation lasts for an average of 64 days, with a range of 40 to 75 days depending on incubation temperature and other extenuating factors.

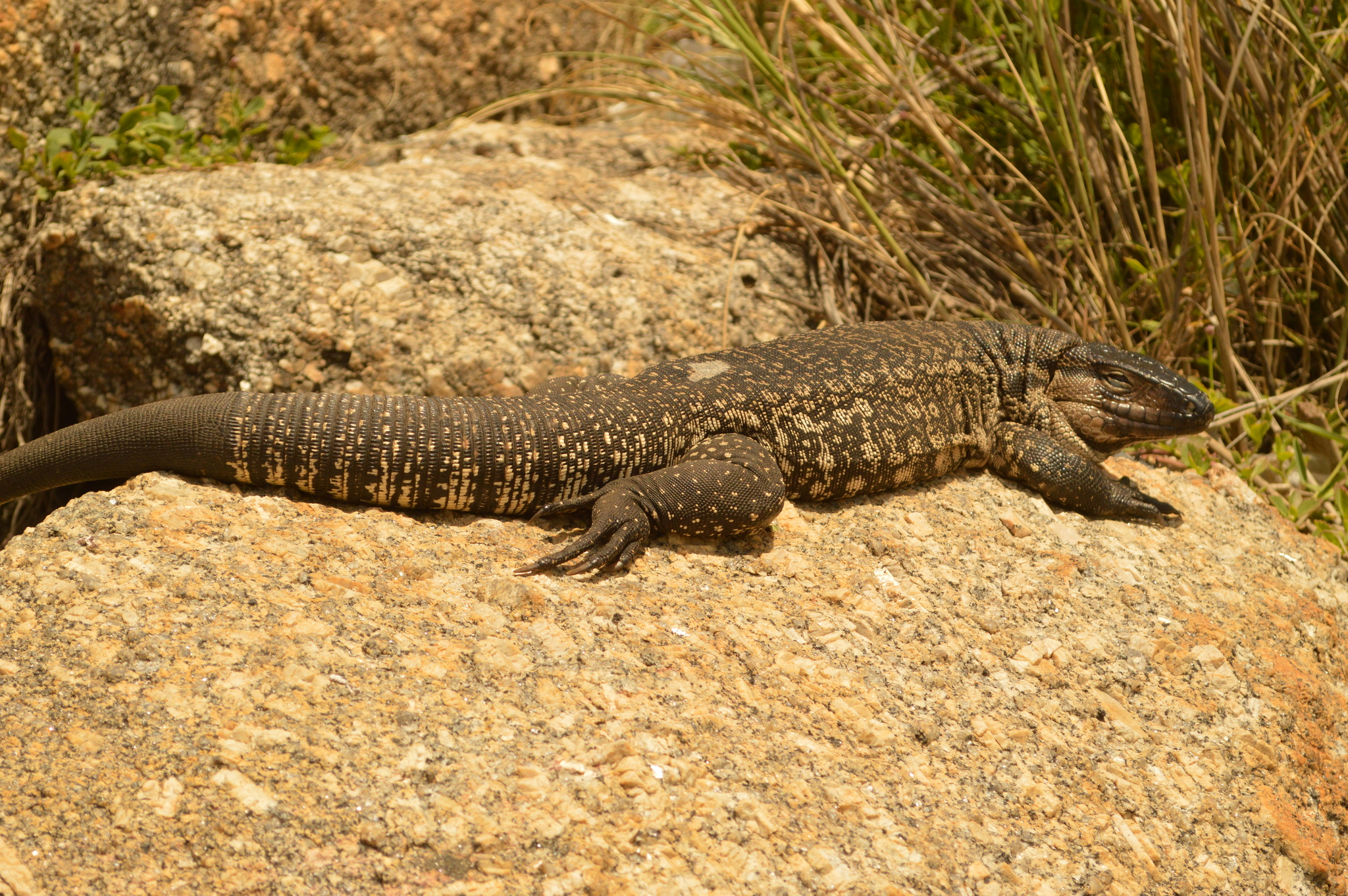
Showing fully regenerated tail, in Uruguay

== Physiology ==
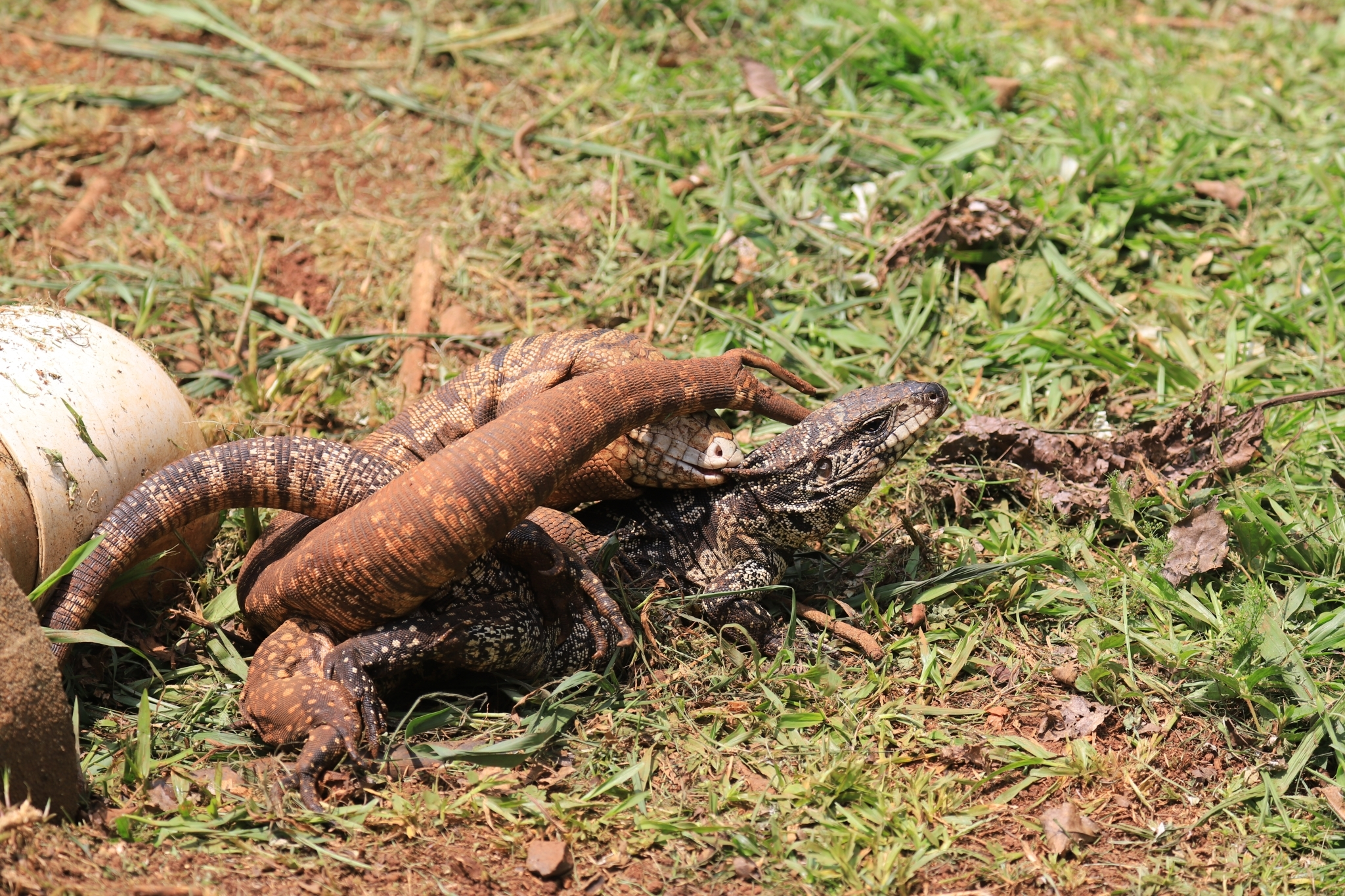
Mating, in Misiones, Argentina. The male has regrown a bifurcated tail

=== Invasive advantage ===
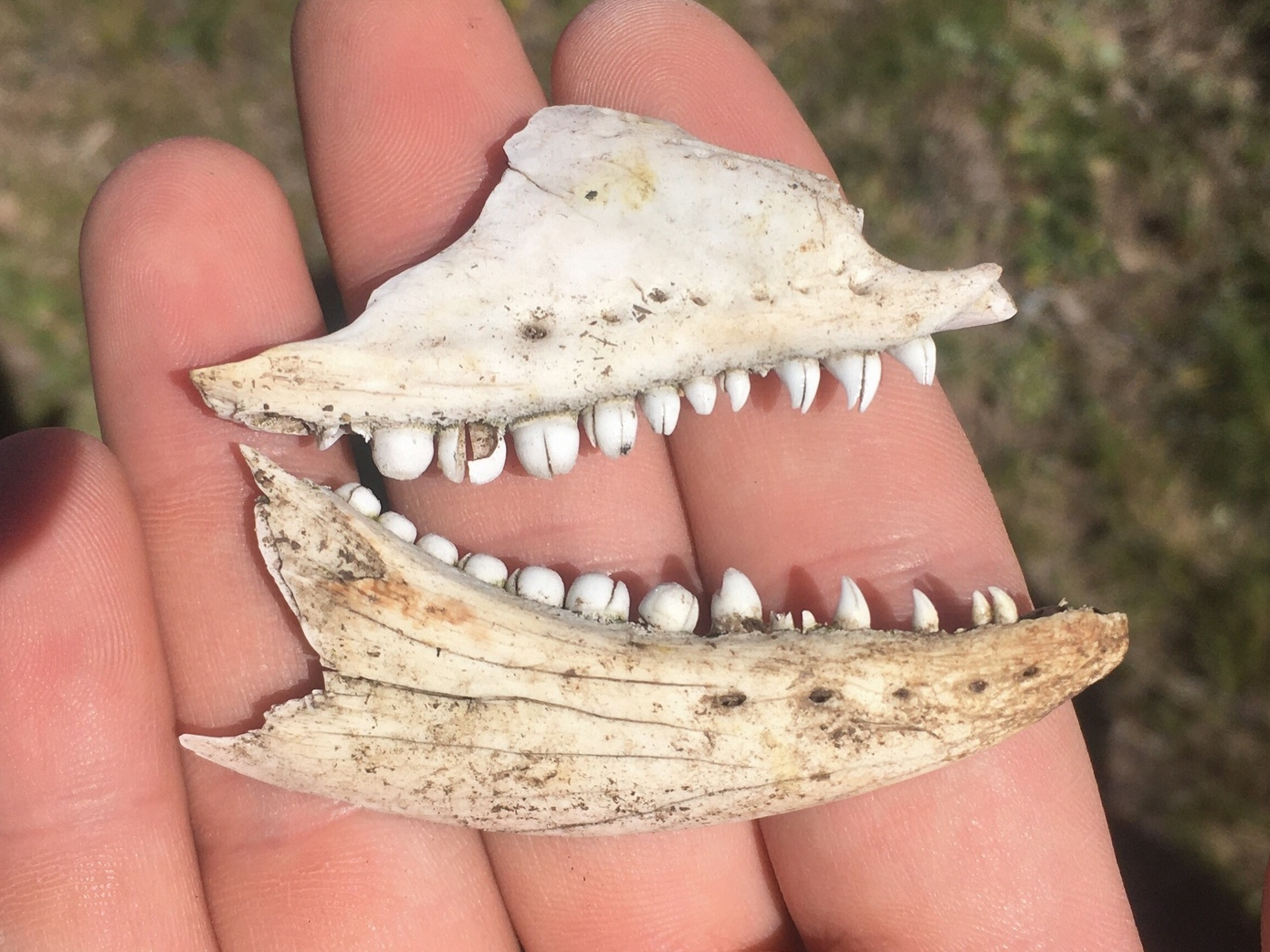
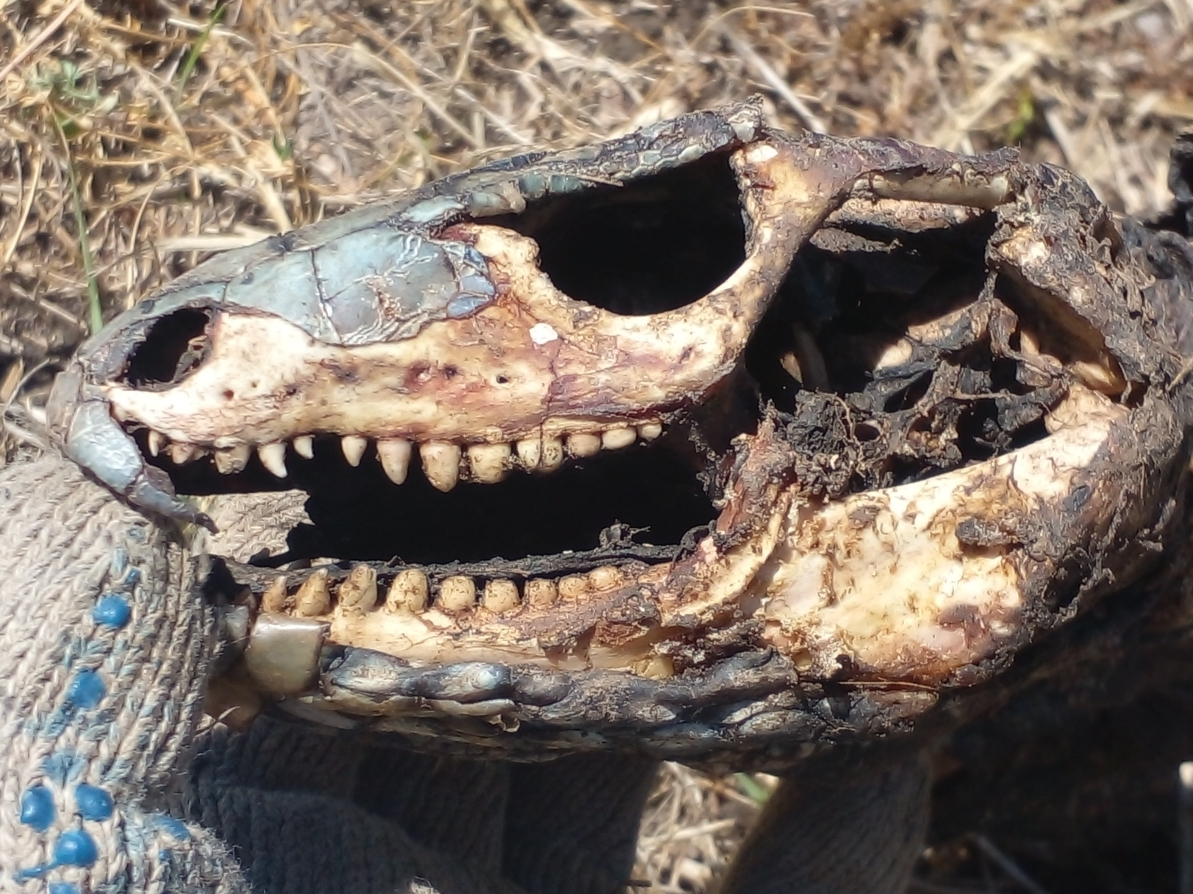
Showing the dentition

Physiologically, tegus possess traits that correlate well with their extreme success as an invasive species. Notably, they mature early, reproduce annually, have large clutch sizes, and a relatively long lifespan compared to other competing species. Of the Teiidae family, tegus tend to grow to the largest body sizes (around 5 kg). Tegus are also omnivorous and consume foods ranging from fruits, invertebrates, and small vertebrates to eggs and carrion. Their large dietary range also contributes to their high survival rate outside of their native habitat. Tegus are active on a seasonal schedule. They avoid dangerously cold or dry climates by hibernating underground. Additionally, they are capable of using endothermy to elevate their body temperatures in response to their environment.

=== Endothermic behavior ===
Tegus in their native environment spend most of the colder months brumating in their burrows without feeding, but emerge in the spring for their mating season. While brumating, their metabolism generates heat that maintains their temperature a few degrees above the burrow temperature, marking them as partial endotherms. This self-reliant endothermic behavior continues into the reproductive season. However, Argentine tegus only display this behavior for part of the year and behave as ectotherms for the rest (sunbathing, temperature reliant on environment). This endothermic behavior is also not a sex-biased evolutionary adaptation for egg production, as both males and females indiscriminately exhibit this behavior.

The Argentine tegu experiences significant shifts in metabolism and body temperature by season. They are highly active throughout the day during warmer months (such as participating in reproductive endothermy during the spring) and experience drastic metabolic suppression during the winter.

Salvator merianae has recently been shown to be one of the few partially warm-blooded lizards, having a temperature up to 10 °C (18 °F) higher than the ambient temperature at nighttime; however, unlike true endotherms such as mammals and birds, these lizards only display temperature control during their reproductive season (September to December), so are said to possess seasonal reproductive endothermy. Because convergent evolution is one of the strongest lines of evidence for the adaptive significance of a trait, the discovery of reproductive endothermy in this lizard not only complements the long known reproductive endothermy observed in some species of pythons, but also supports the hypothesis that the initial selective benefit for endothermy in birds and mammals was reproductive.

=== Locomotion ===
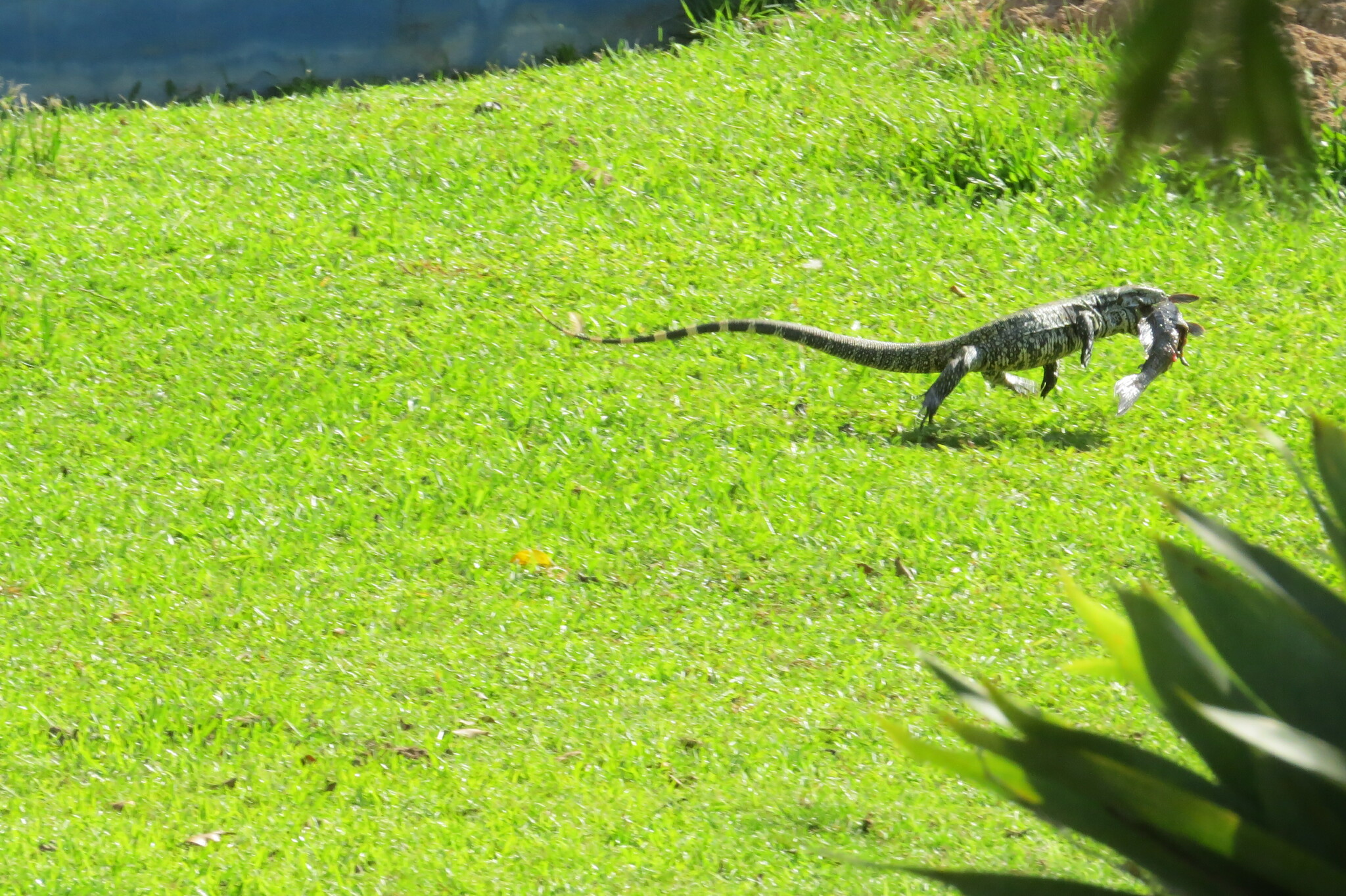
Running after scavenging a dead fish, in Santa Catarina, Brazil

Tegus are capable of running at high speeds and can run bipedally for short distances. They often use this method in territorial defense, with their mouths open and front legs held wide to look more threatening.

The Argentine black and white tegu is used to study the evolutionary history of shoulder joint locomotive muscles. Because of its weight and heavy girth, it has unique modifications to its skeletal gait that help map the evolutionary history of the nonmammalian musculoskeletal structure.

== Interactions with humans and livestock ==
=== As household pets ===
==== Blue tegu ====
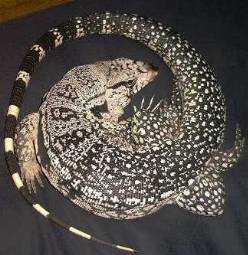
An immature blue tegu resting: Note the single black mark on its snout.

The blue tegu is a variant known for its light blue coloration, which is most intense and vivid in the adult males. Even immature animals can be easily distinguished from other tegus – mostly black and white – by the "singe mark" on their noses. They are among the more suitable tegus for pets and can be easily tamed, but in the wild, they either try to run away or react aggressively if provoked.

The scientific classification of the blue tegu is contentious. Large-scale taxon sampling of the teiids has not led to any strong resolutions based on morphological and genetic data; the majority of data about the blue tegu comes from hobbyists. Some believe it is a mutation of the Argentine black and white tegu, while others, including the original importer, believe it is sufficiently different to classified as its own species, or a subspecies. The first blue tegu to be exported from South America was in a wholesale shipment of tegus from Colombia.

The coloring of a "blue" tegu can range from a simple black and white color, to albino, to powder blue, to even platinum (which is basically a high white color morph). The distinct colouration does not tend to appear until the animal reaches sexual maturity, around the age of 18 months or it reaches 60 cm (2 ft) or more in size. Just like the Argentine black and white tegu, the blue tegu has a very quick growth rate, almost reaching 75% of its full length in 1 year. Their adult length can vary from 80 cm (2.5 ft) in adult females to sometimes even longer than 120 cm (4 ft) in adult males. Unlike many other lizards, tegus are very heavily built animals, ranging from 3 to 5 kg (7 to 12 lb) or more when fully grown. Size varies due to genetics, husbandry (if any), and diet.

==== Legality ====
On May 28, 2021 the South Carolina Department of Natural Resources banned their importation and breeding, and requires registration of black and white tegus already in South Carolina.

=== As food ===
S. merianae – like other animals used for bushmeat – is a common food source for humans in its native range. It could be an economically and dietarily beneficial meat source if used more widely.

=== Leather trade ===
Argentine black and white tegus have long been hunted for their skins to supply the international leather trade. They are one of the most exploited reptile species in the world, but trade is legal in most South American countries. It is not an endangered species and overharvesting has not as of yet been observed.

== Invasive species ==
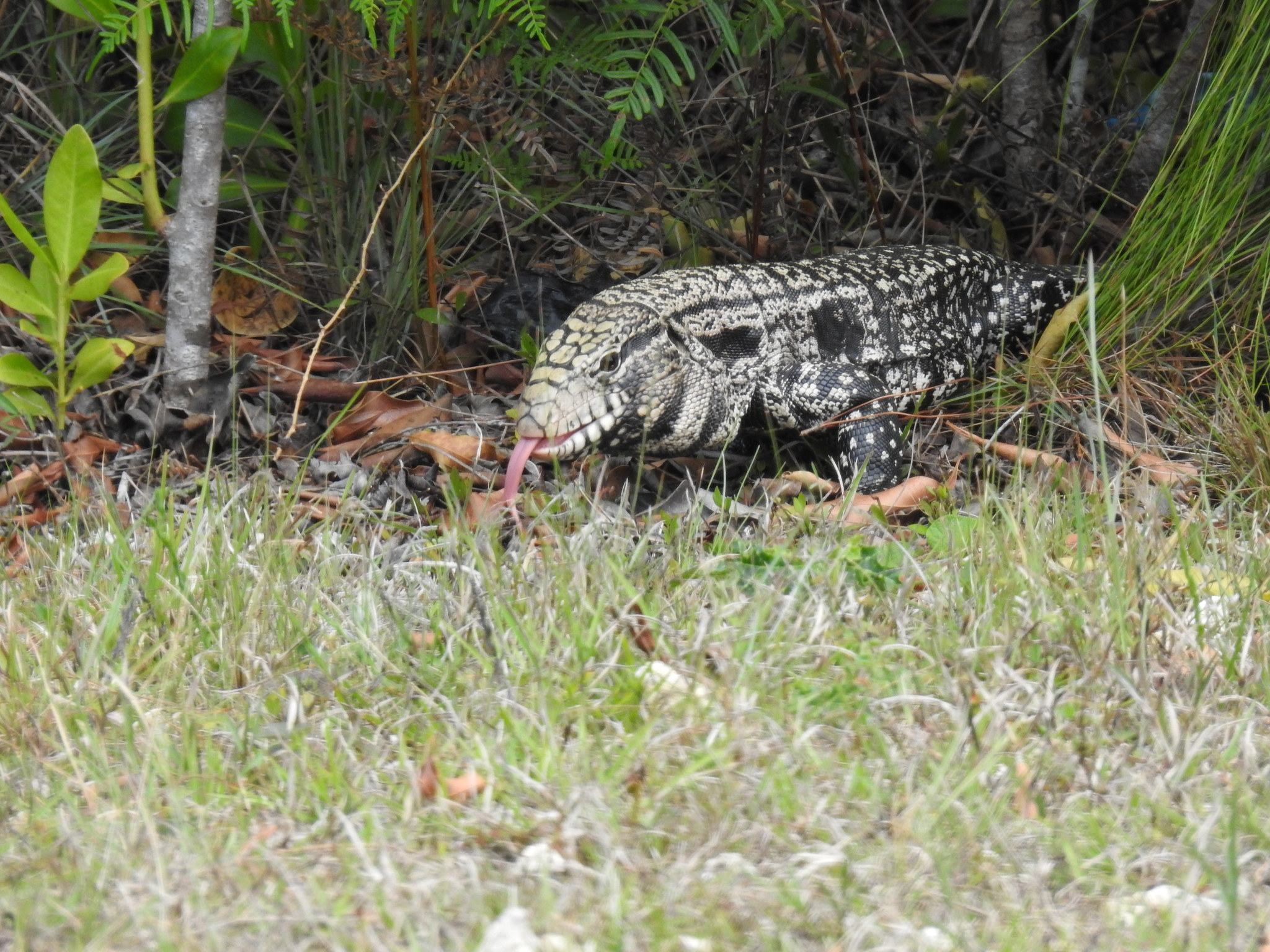
In Florida, where it is an introduced species

In various places around the world, such as Tawan, Phuket, and Florida, Argentine black and white tegus have escaped from the pet trade and are now an invasive species in Florida, Georgia and South Carolina. The first sighting of S. merianae in Berkeley County, South Carolina was on 10 September 2020. Eight total sightings in South Carolina had been recorded as of 10 September 2020.

The Argentine black and white tegu has been a particular threat to native birds and reptiles that build nests or burrows on the ground.

=== Management ===
Efforts such as placing traps or local hunting have been largely inadequate at reducing their negative effects in the non-native environments.

Because of their invasive threat to native and imperiled species, population containment initiatives have been a priority in the past 10 years, leading to the extraction of nearly 3,300 tegus from Miami-Dade County alone. Tegu culling efforts have had little effect: Historically, tegus survived brutal leather-trade harvests in their native environment, demonstrating that they are a remarkably resilient species.

As of 29 April 2021, residents of Florida are now legally allowed to kill these invasive Argentine black and white tegus that are spotted on private property, with the landowners' permission, and on the public lands of Florida. Legal barriers that had been protecting the non-native reptiles have been removed, to prevent the population of tegus from increasing in Florida. As an alternative to killing them, the Florida Fish and Wildlife Conservation Commission staff offers to take control and maintain this species by capturing and removing tegus from the environment.

== Gallery ==
Colour variation

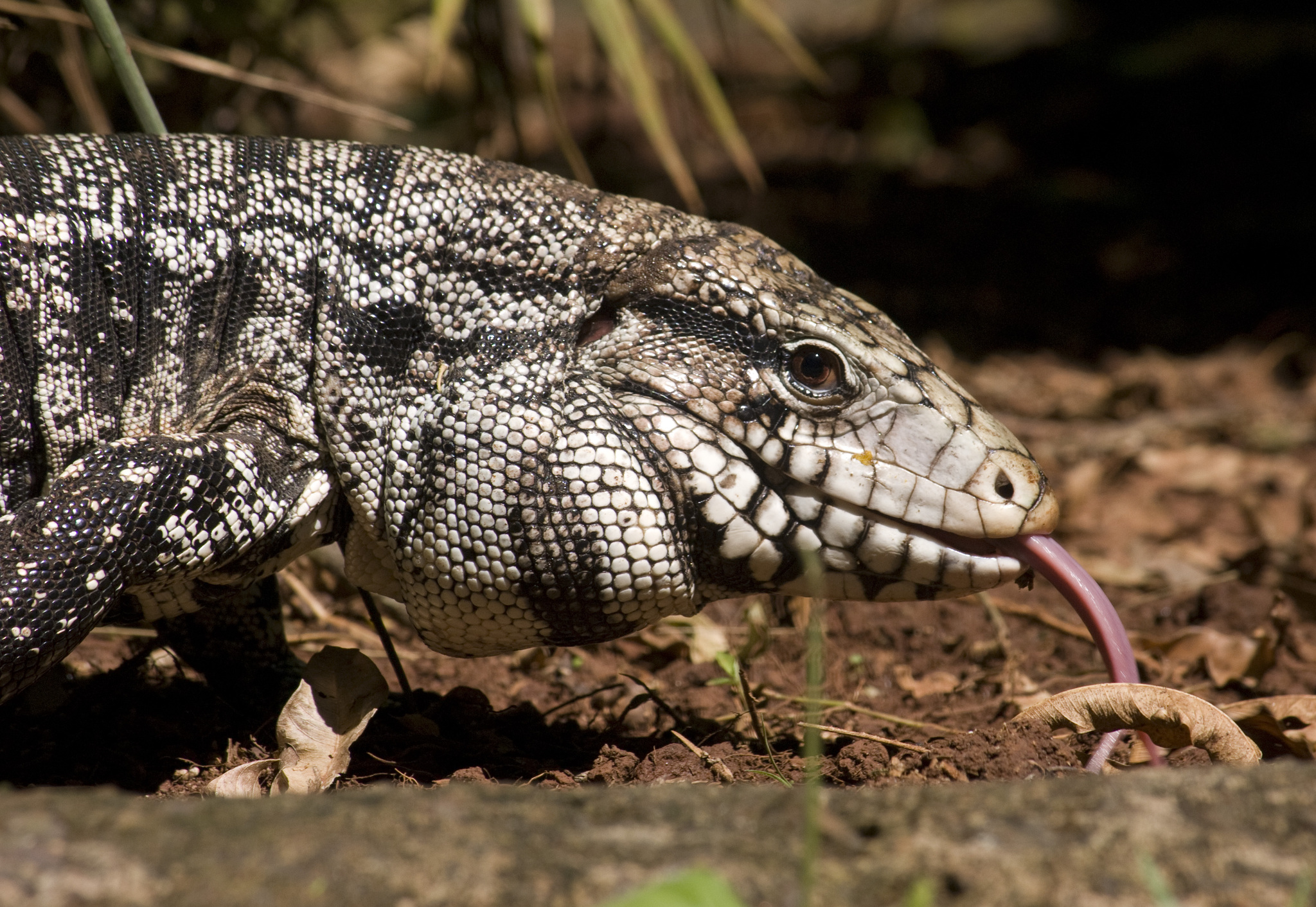
Misiones, Argentina

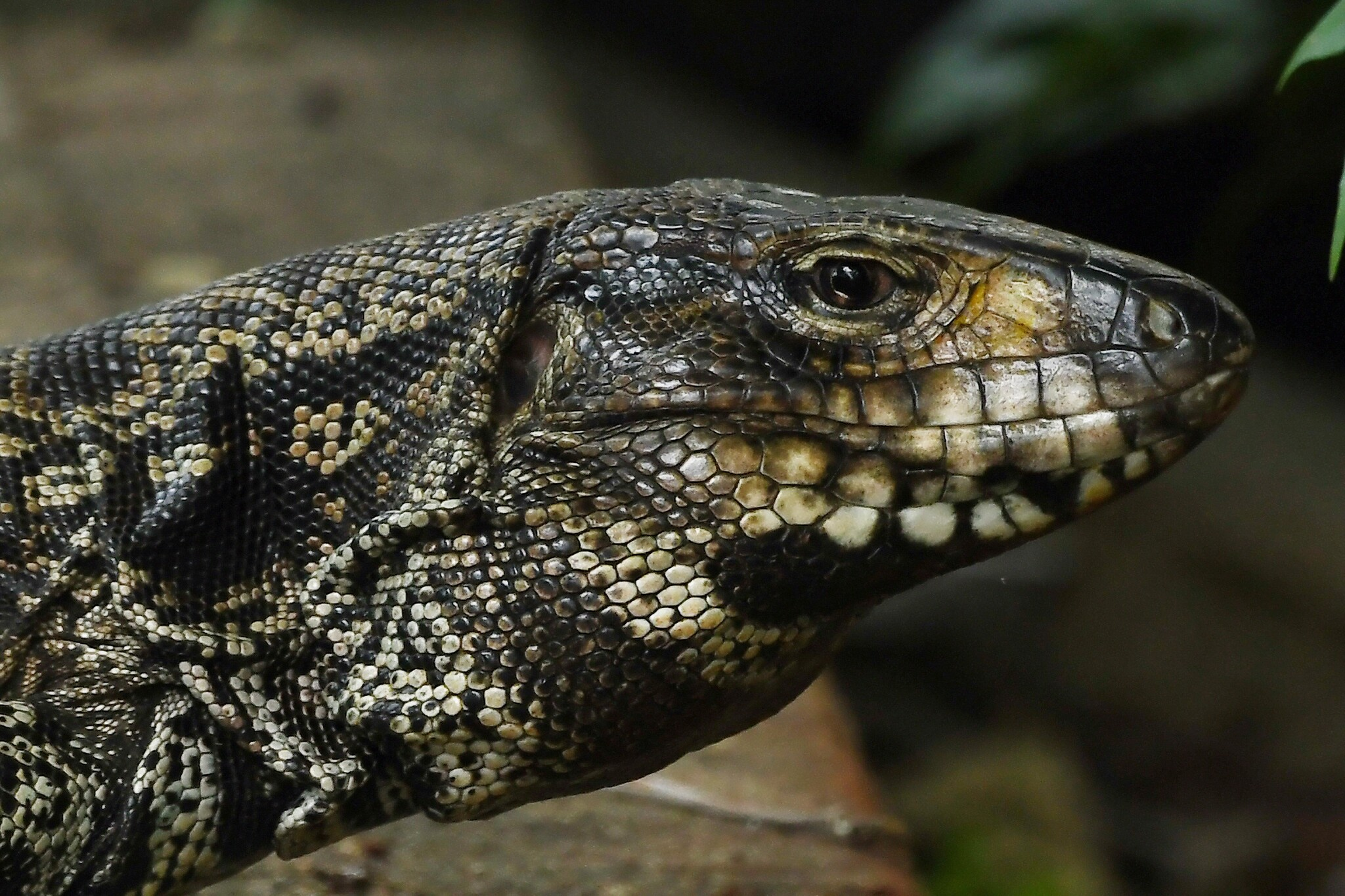
Misiones, Argentina

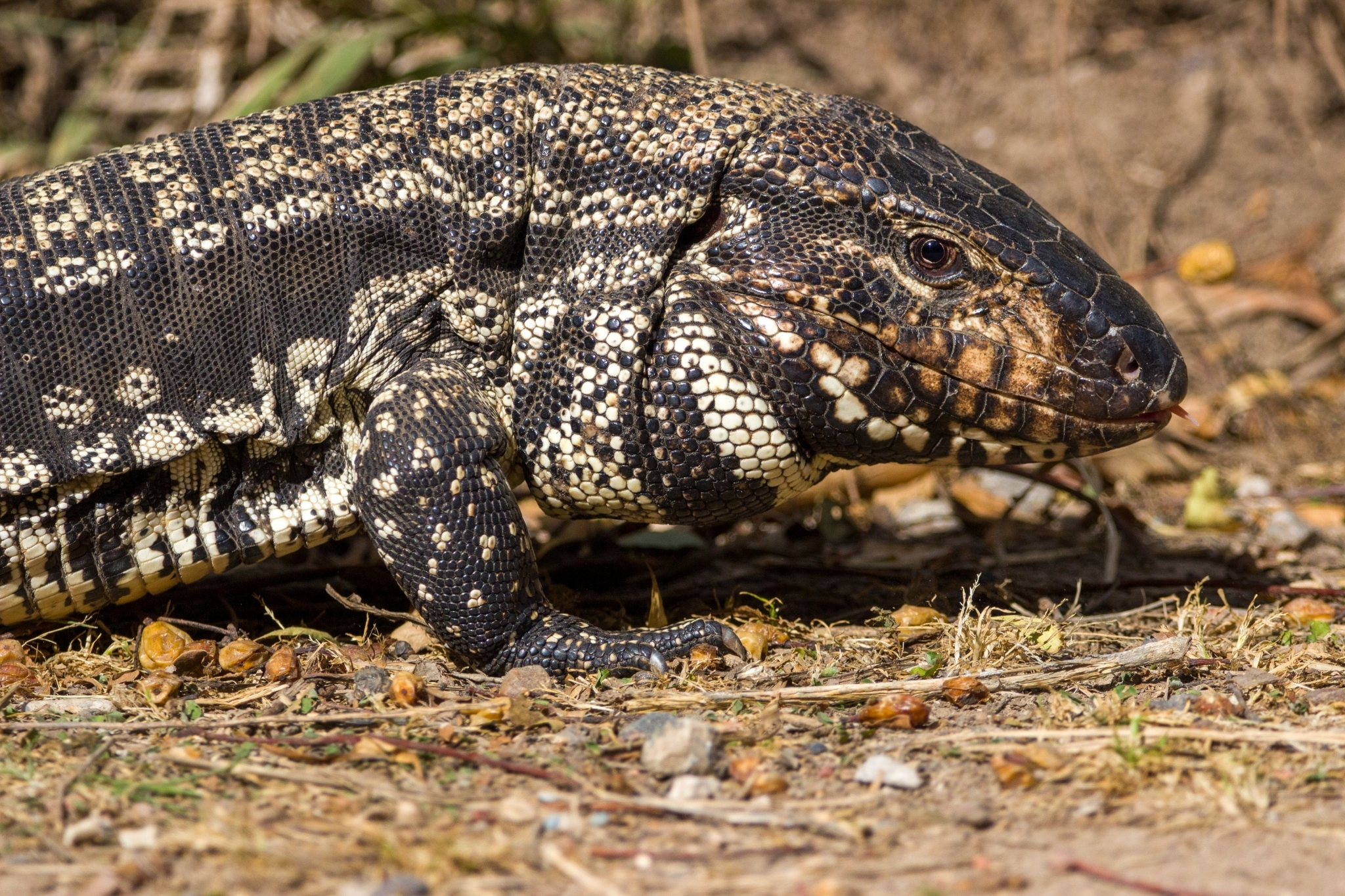
Buenos Aires, Argentina

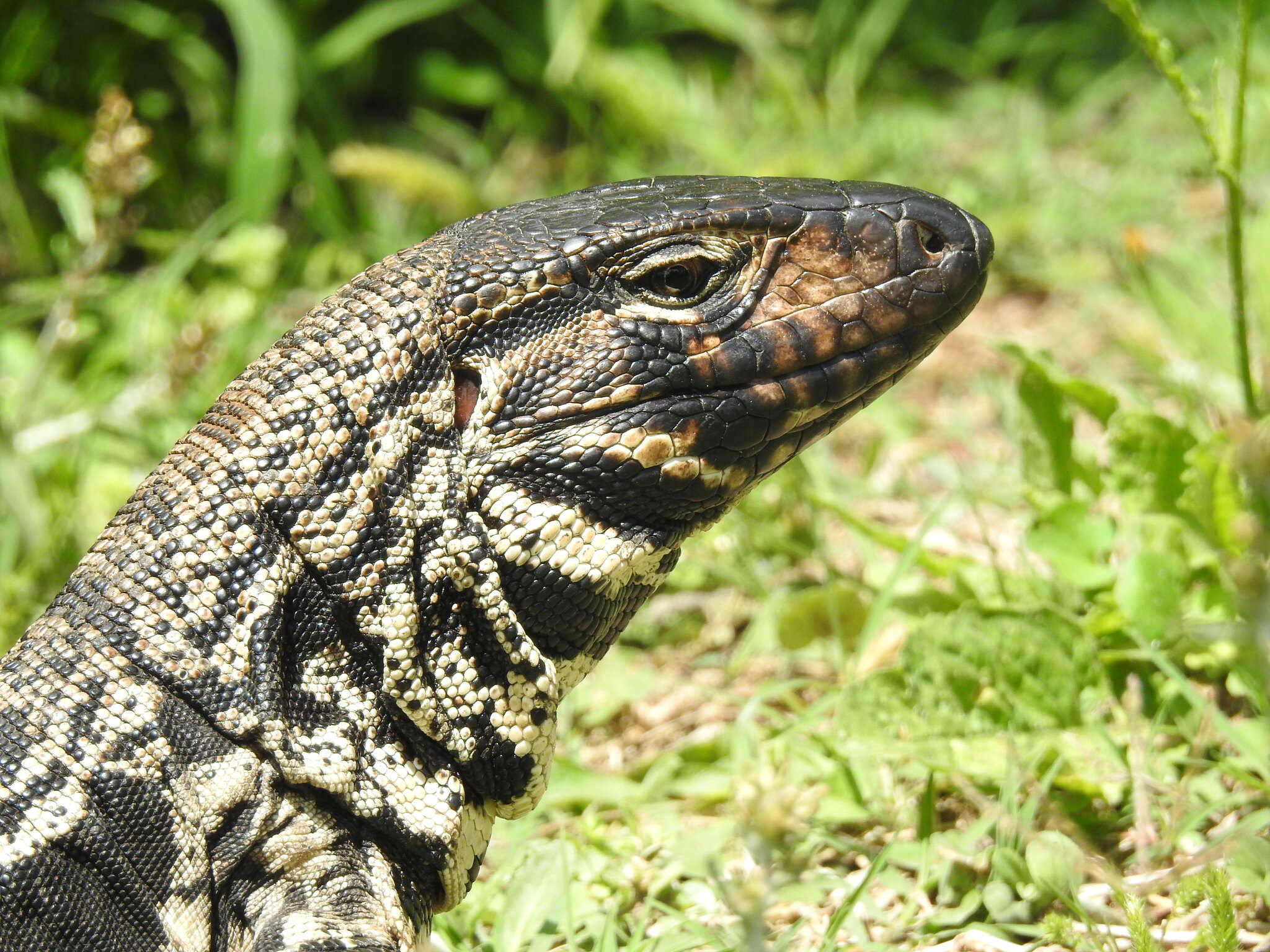
Buenos Aires, Argentina

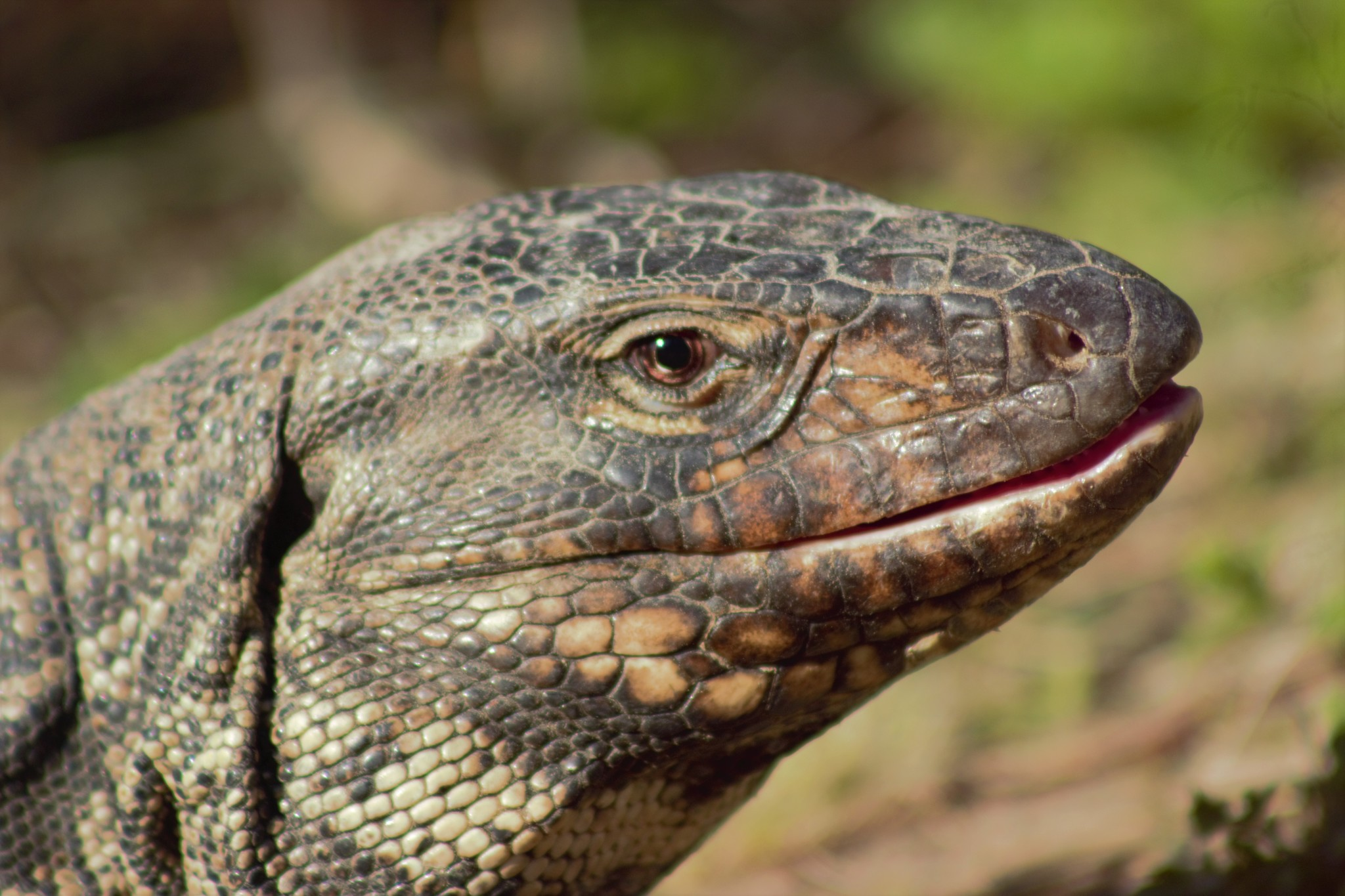
Buenos Aires, Argentina

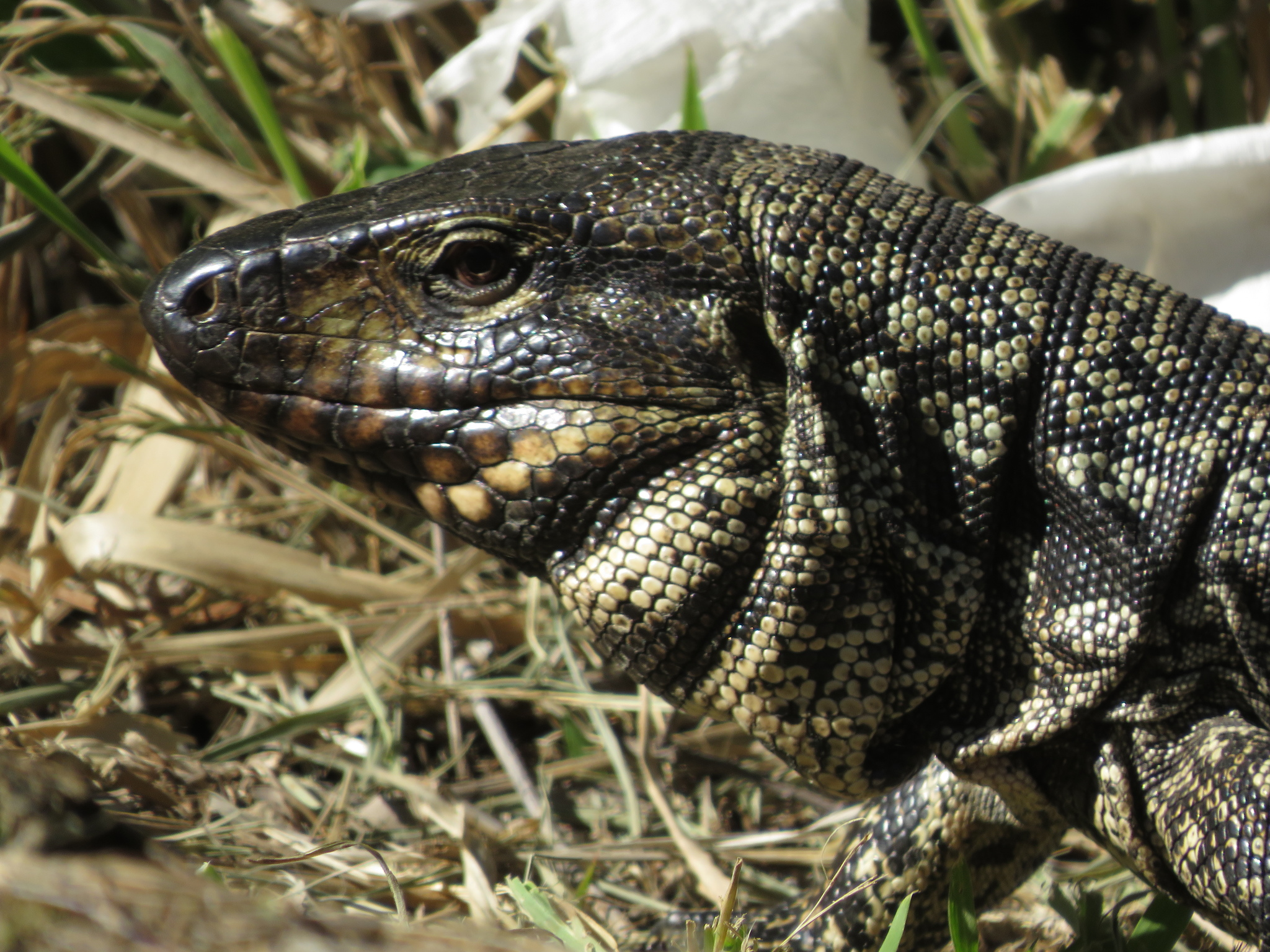
Buenos Aires, Argentina

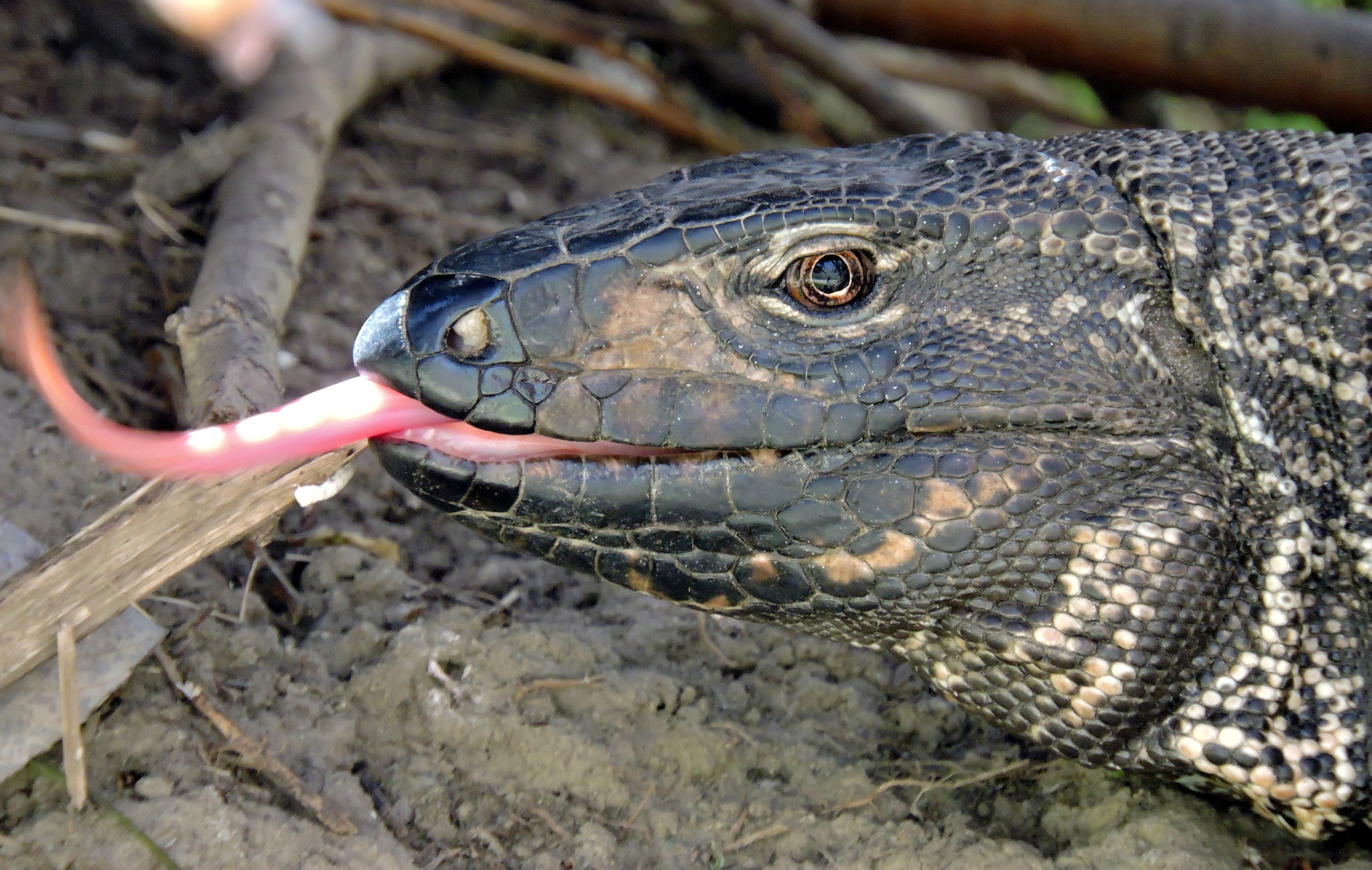
Buenos Aires, Argentina

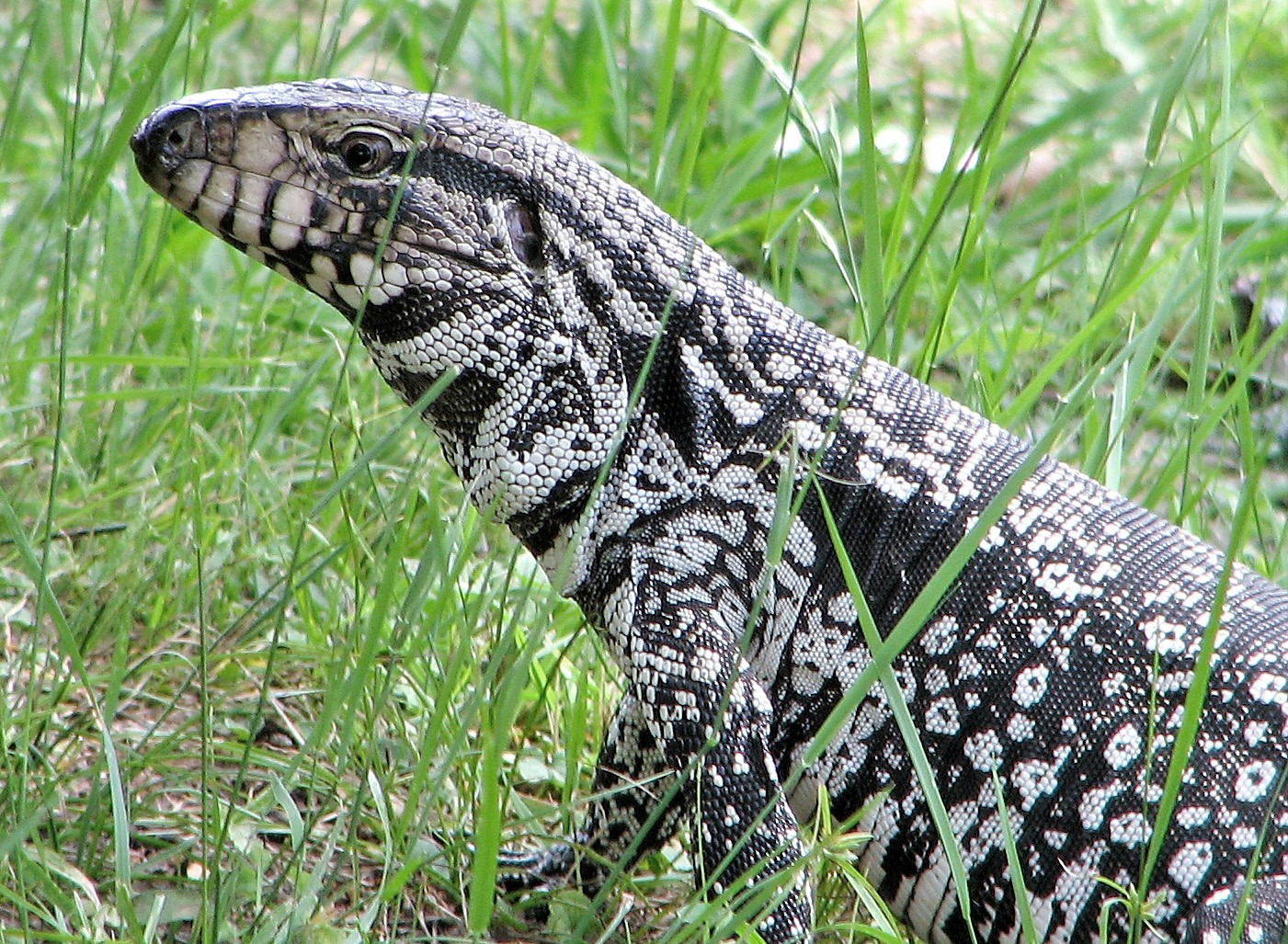
Entre Ríos, Argentina

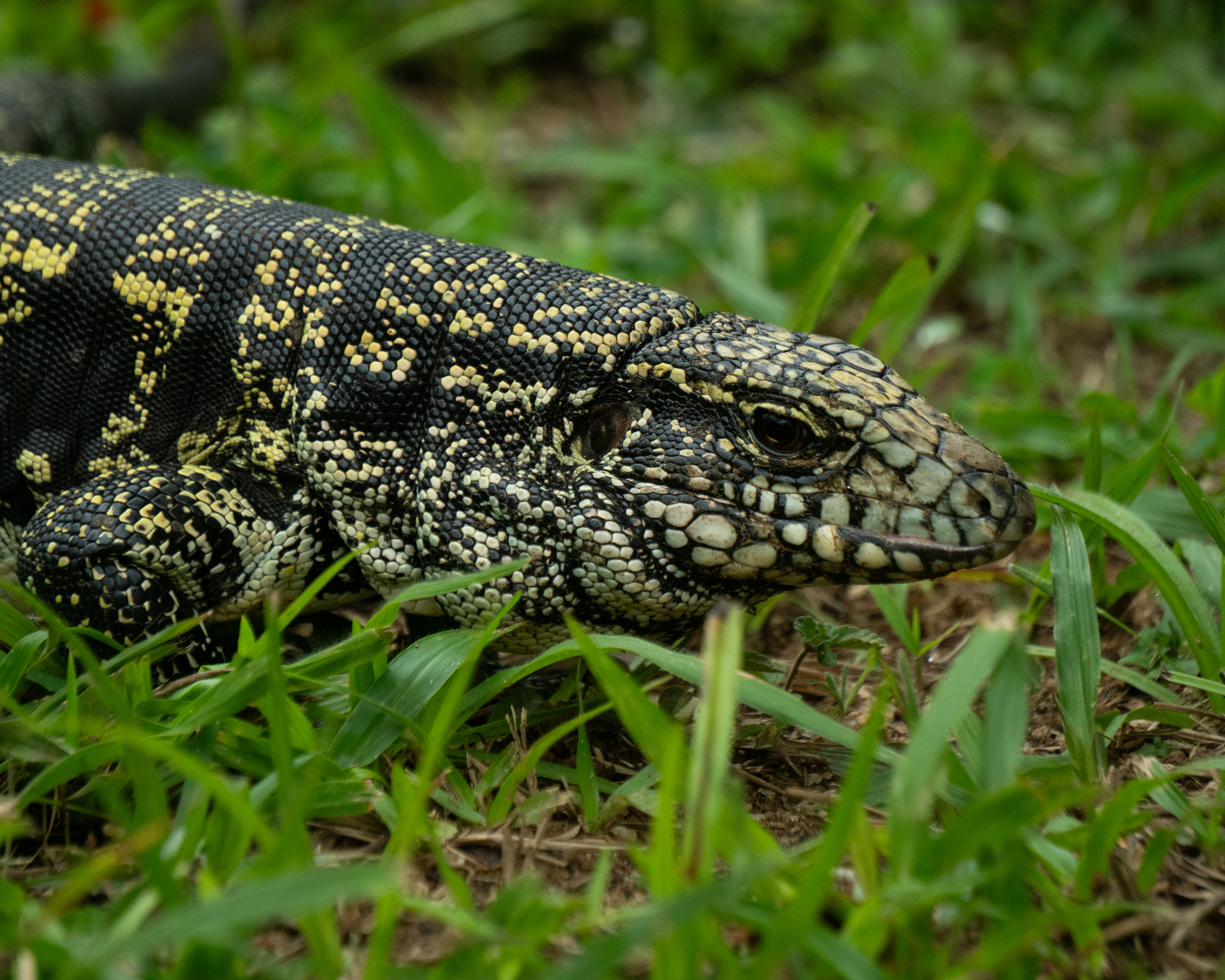
Rio de Janeiro, Brazil

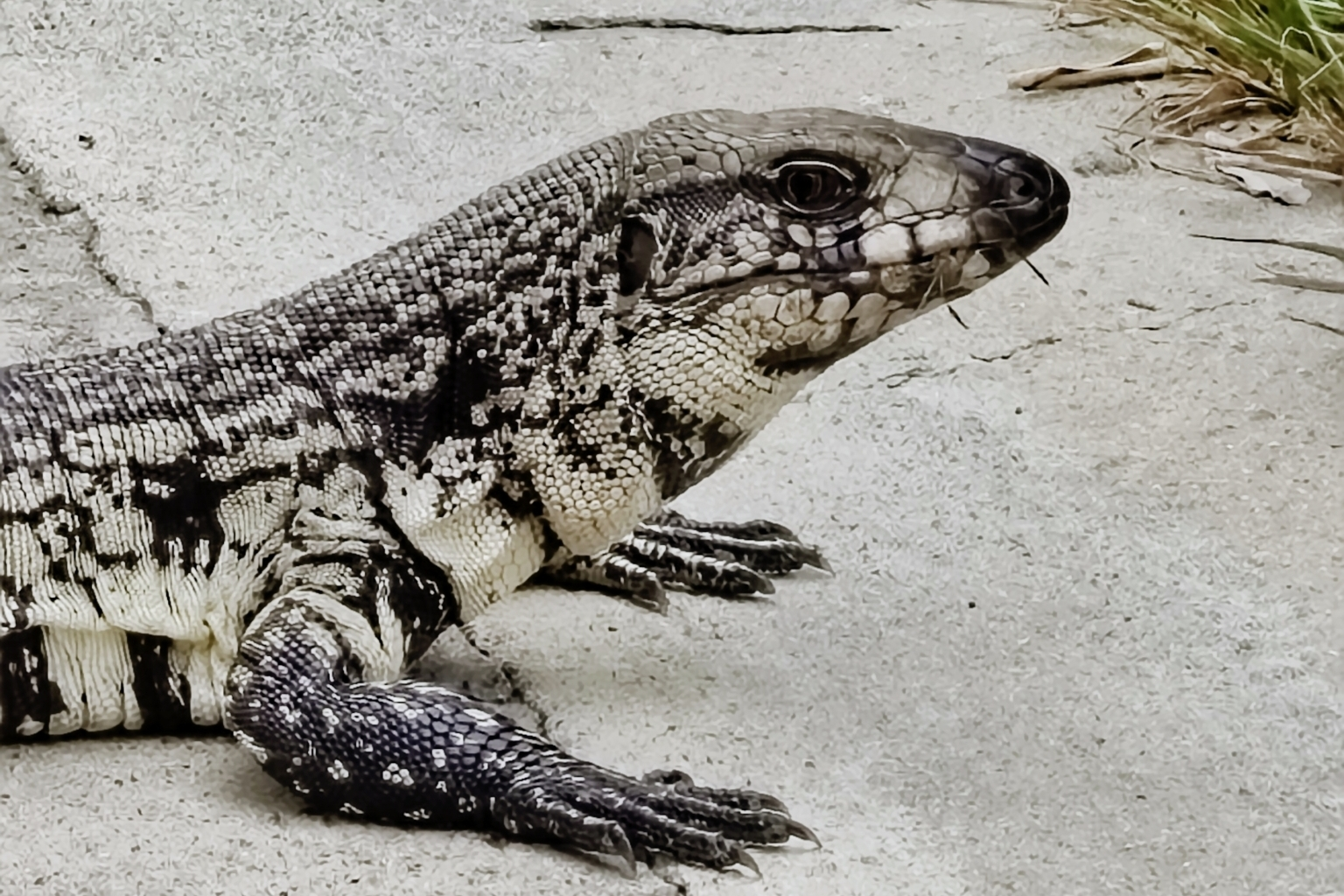
Pernambuco, Brazil

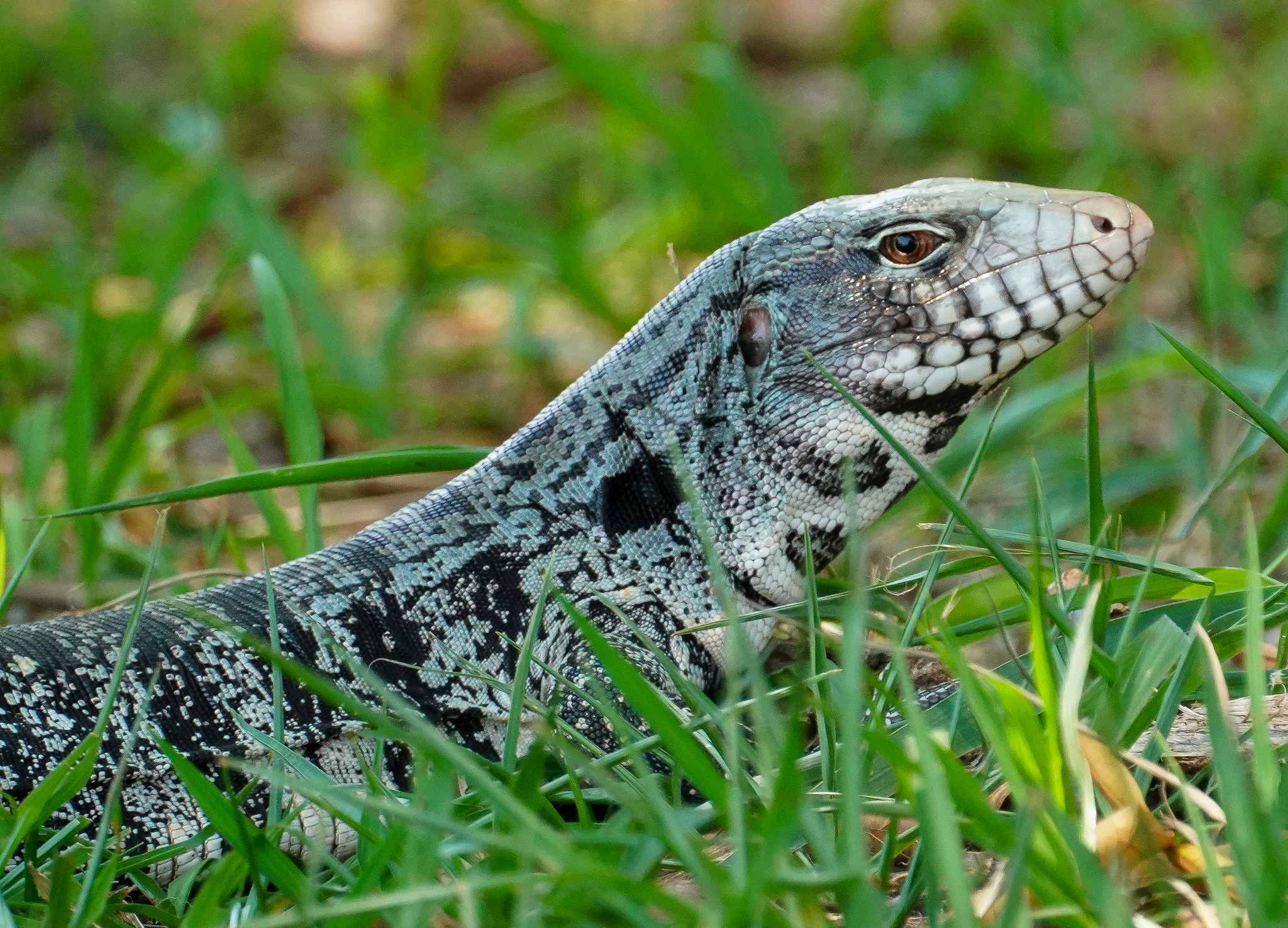
Mato Grosso, Brazil

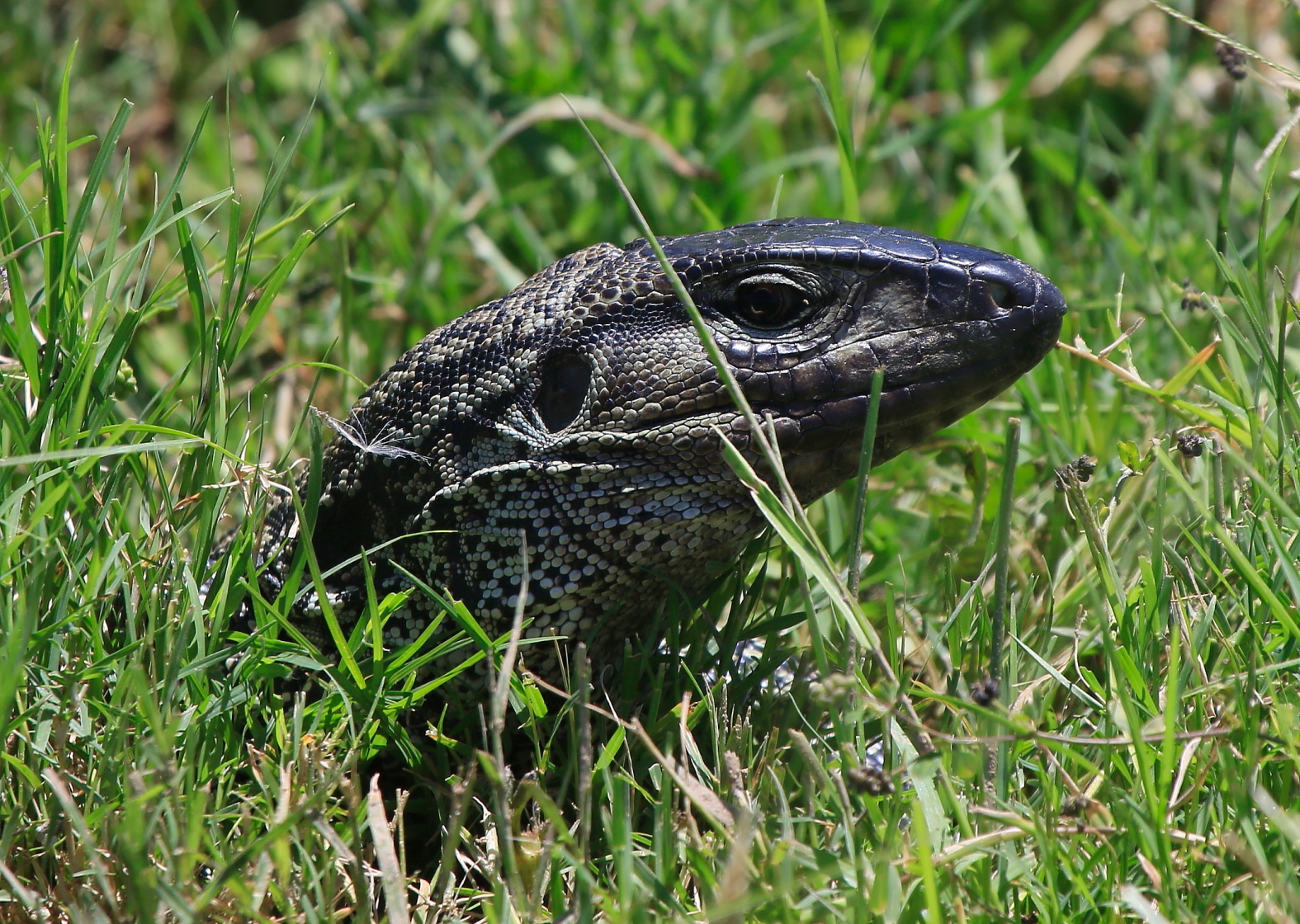
Rio Grande do Sul, Brazil

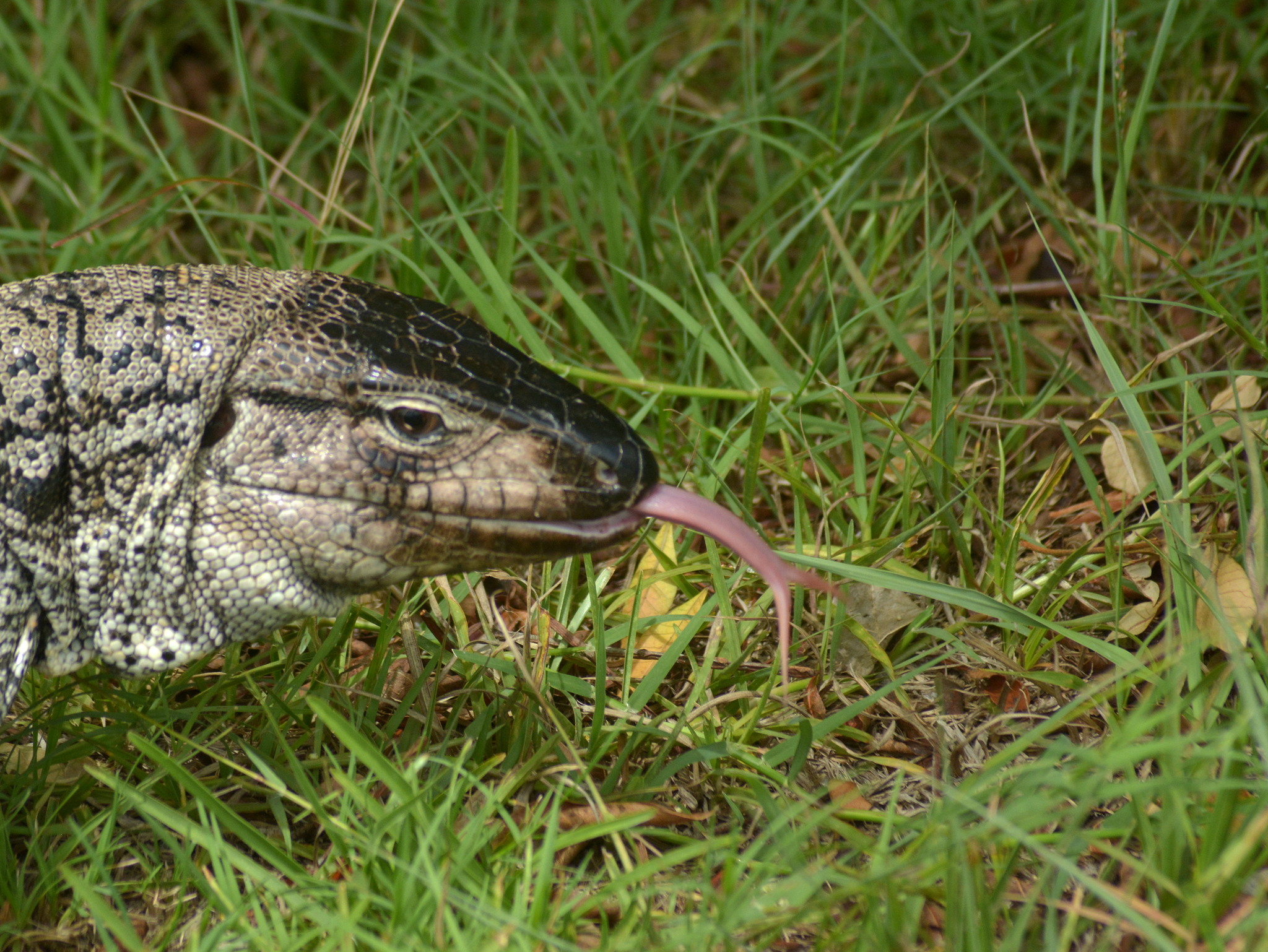
Rio Grande do Sul, Brazil

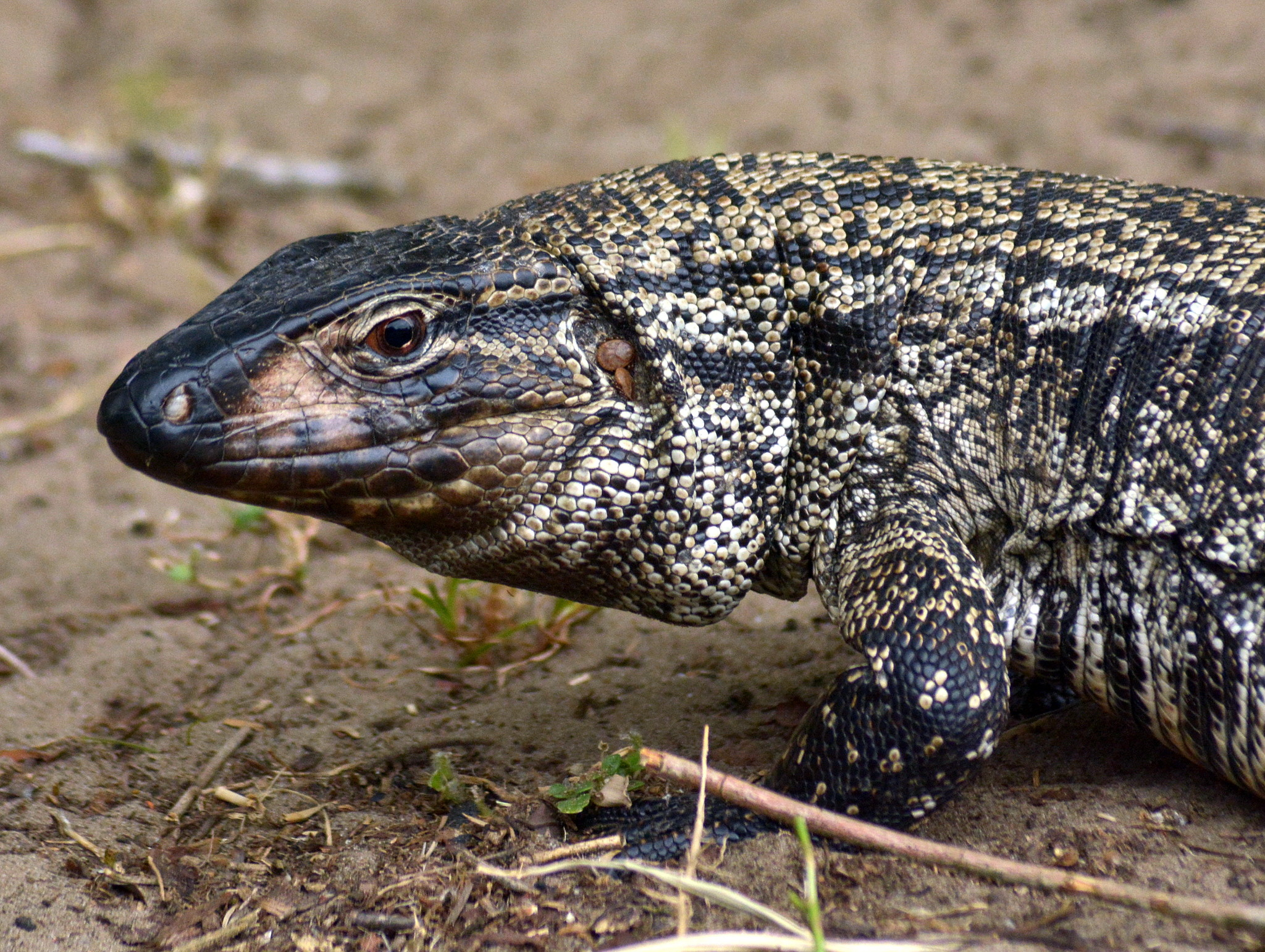
Rio Grande do Sul, Brazil

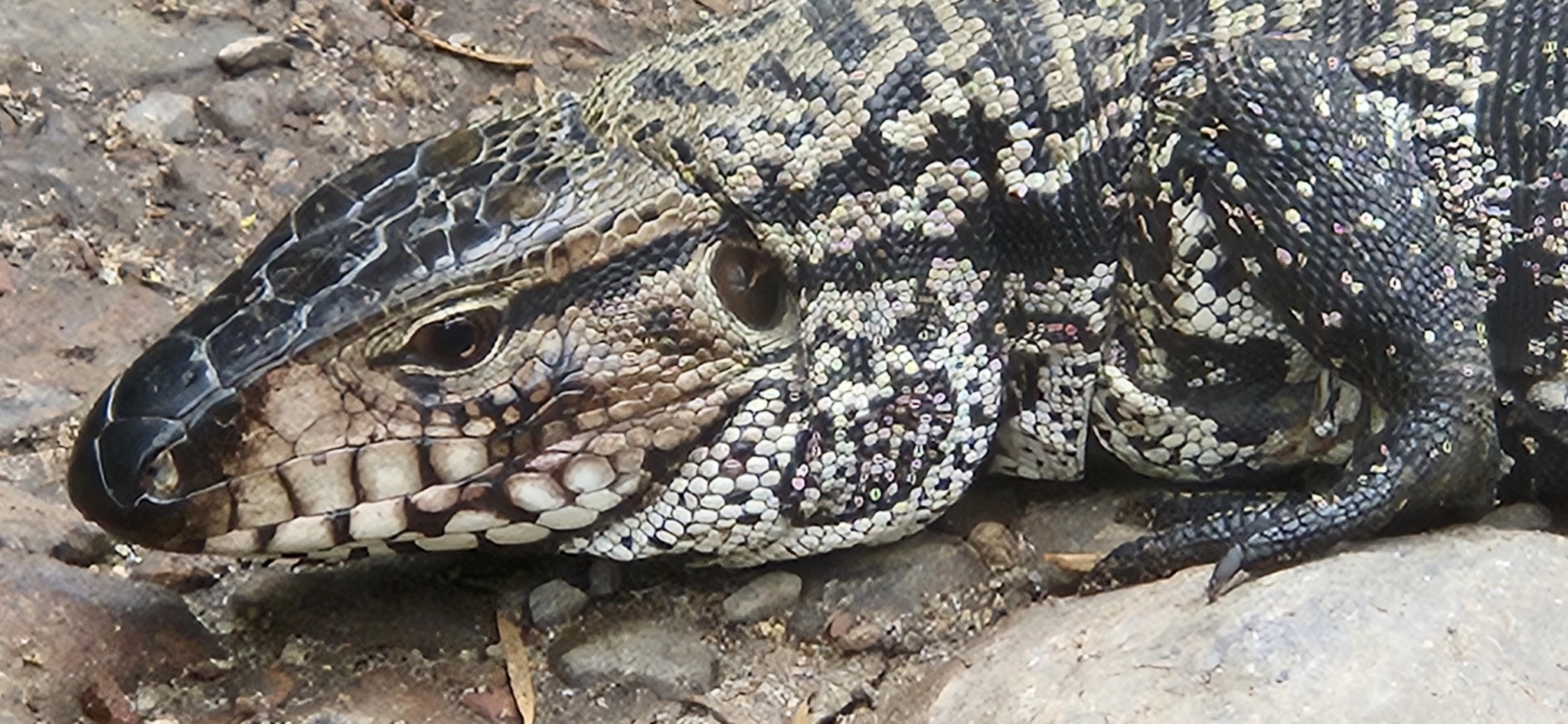
Rio Grande do Sul, Brazil

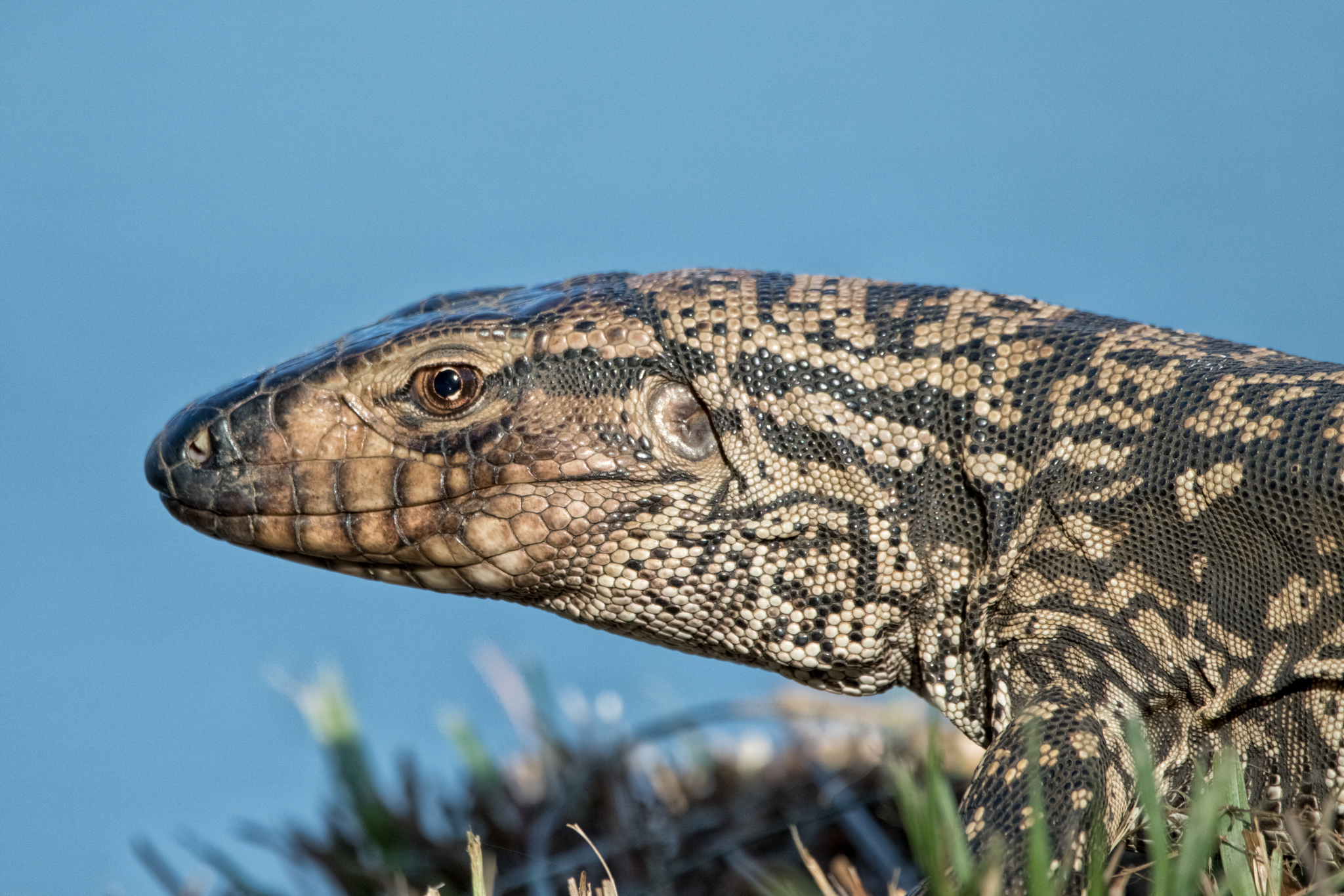
Rio Grande do Sul, Brazil

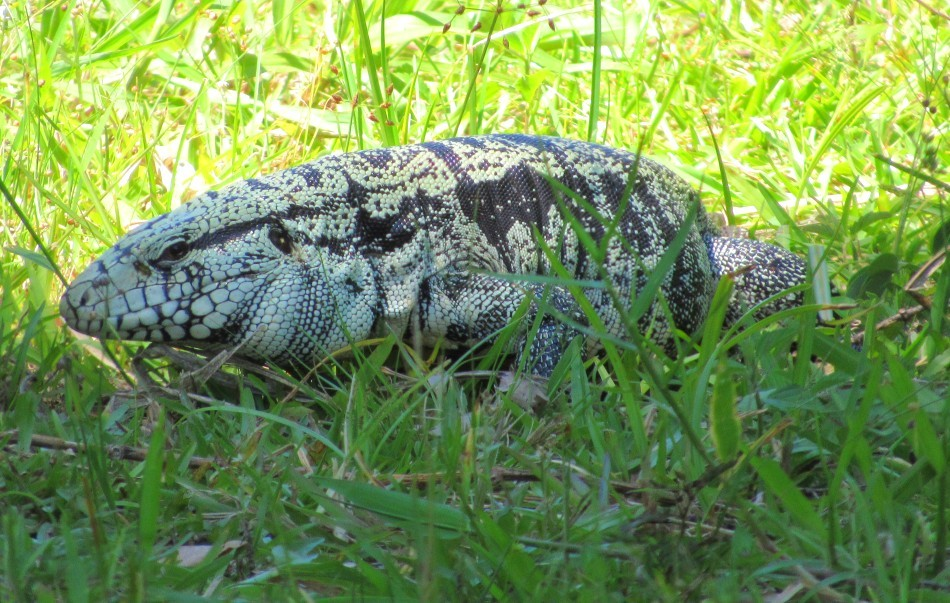
Santa Catarina, Brazil

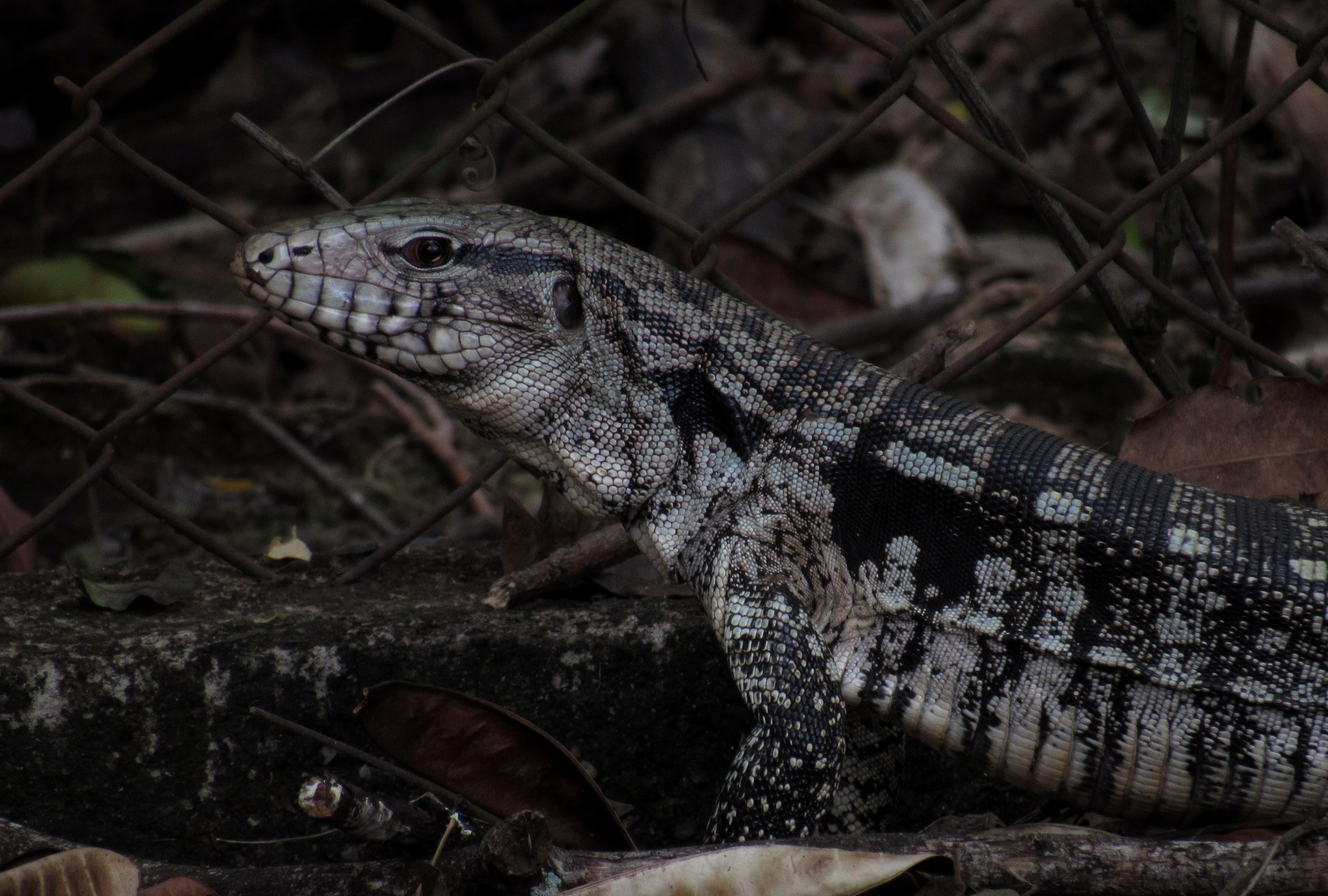
São Paulo, Brazil

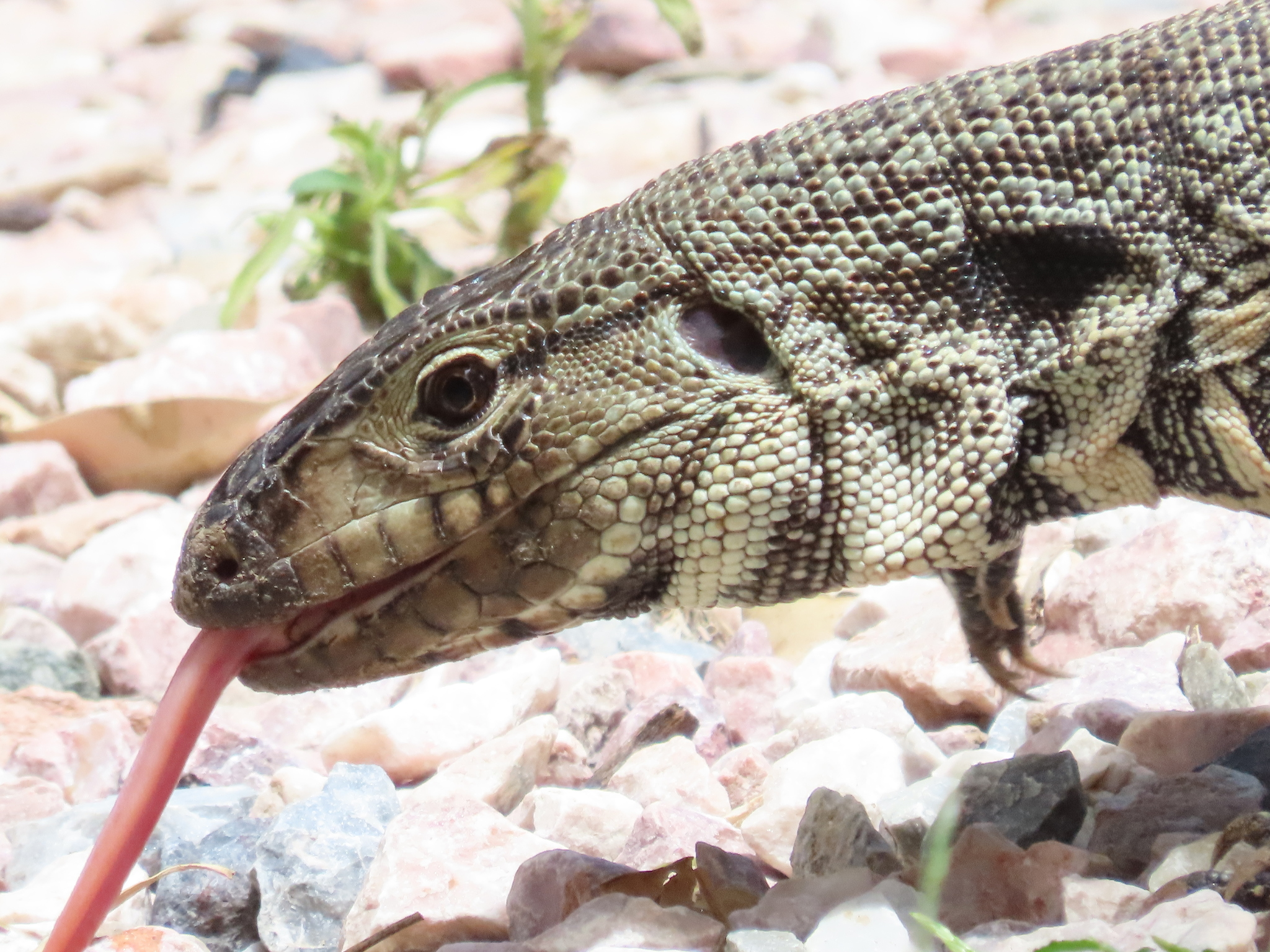
Maldonado, Uruguay

== See also ==
- Gold tegu
- Teius
- Teius teyou
