= Merian family =

Family

Merian
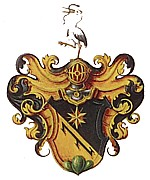
- Earlier spellings: Merillate, Merylat, Miregla, Mureglat, Mariatte
- Origin: Basel, Switzerland
- Members: Matthäus Merian, Maria Sibylla Merian, Christoph Merian, Andreas Merian-Iselin

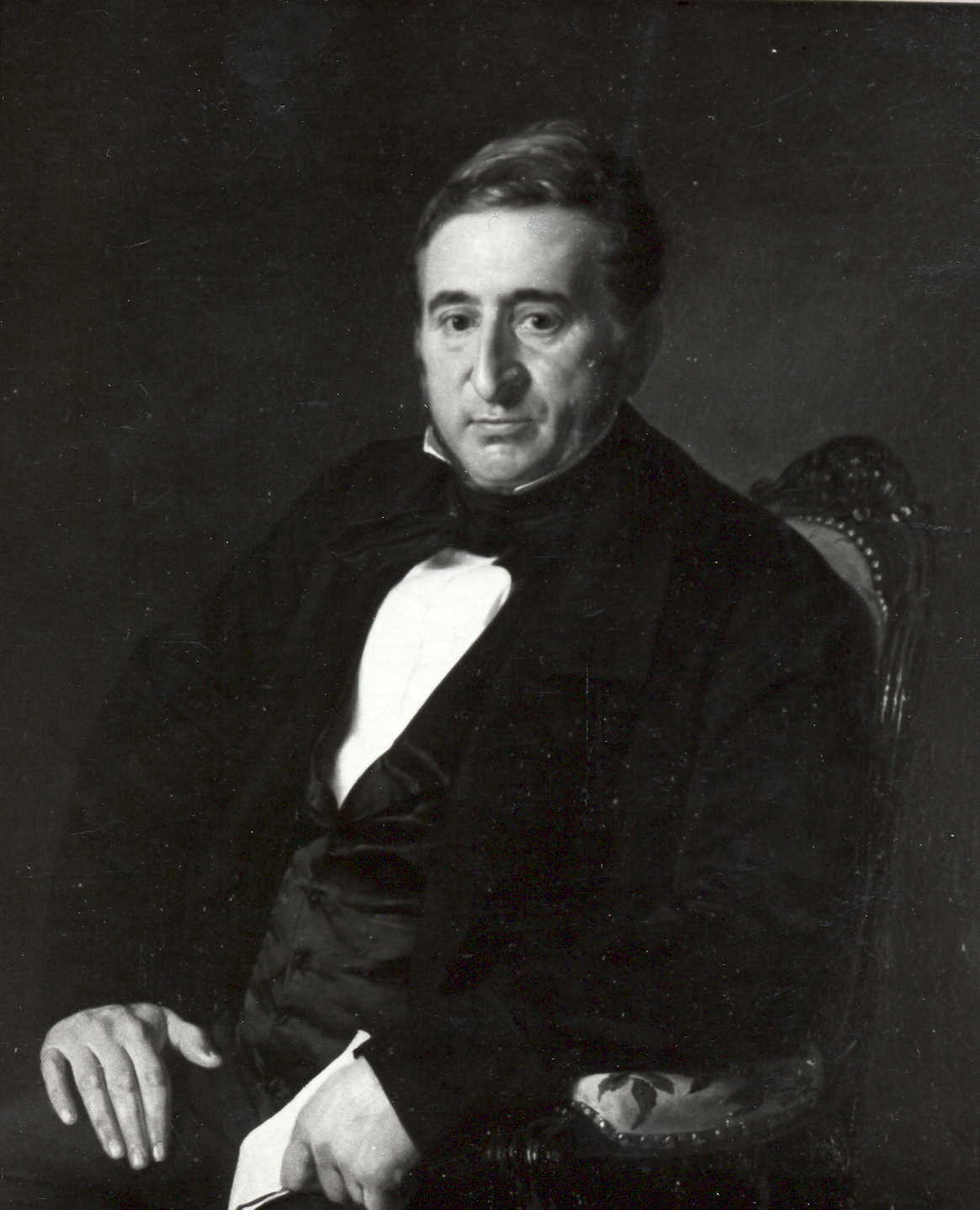
Banker, businessman and agriculturalist Christoph Merian (1800–1858) of the 'elder Basel line', who became one of the richest men in Switzerland.

The Merian family is a patrician family of Basel, Switzerland. It consists of two branches (an 'elder Basel line' and a 'younger' one) who were citizens of Basel from 1498 and from 1549/1553. The family were represented in the Grand Council of Basel-Stadt in 1532 and grew to become distinguished aldermen. Its notable members include the 18th century politician Andreas Merian-Iselin and the 19th century banker Christoph Merian, who founded the renowned Basel charity Christoph Merian Stiftung.

The younger Basel line includes a Frankfurt sub-branch founded by the engraver Matthäus Merian the Elder (1593-1650), whose descendants became artists during the Baroque period and ran what became one of Europe's largest publishers in the 17th century. Matthäus Merian's daughter was the naturalist and artist Maria Sibylla Merian.

== Origin and distribution ==
The family name is not limited to Basel, and is also found (in variants like Meria, Merian, Meriam and von Merian) in Alsace, Lorraine, Provence, Lower Austria, and Mecklenburg. These families are probably not directly related to the Merians of Basel, but a common root is likely in the former Prince-Bishopric of Basel in the earliest forms of the name Merillate, Merylat, Miregla, Mureglat or Latinized Mariatte. The name probably derives from the office of Meier (meaning steward or estate manager); unlikely, however, is a speculated relationship to the community of Meria in Corsica or to an alleged Merian Abbey in the Archdiocese of Strasbourg, and the same is unlikely with reference to the Marioni nobility from Milan or to de Muriaux in the Bishopric of Basel.

The oldest written reference to the family in the bishopric dates from the year 1385 with the mention of a Jehannin dit Mariatte de Buratte ("'Johann, called Mariatte, citizens, bears witness'"), who resided in a dairy at Bure, Switzerland. This dairy farm had belonged since 1283 to the bishops of Basel, before the dukes of Alsace and the Counts of Mömpelgard/Montbéliard and von Pfirt/Ferrette.

== Naturalisation in Basel ==
The ancestor of the Merians of Basel is Theobald Merian (c.1415 – c.1505), a Basel episcopal bailiff or steward in Lüttelsdorf (now Courroux) in the Swiss canton of Jura. From him are descended the two Basel branches of the family. The elder line stems from his son Theobald Merian (1465 – 1544), who went in 1480 as a seaman of Lüttelsdorf to Basel and later operated a sawmill on the right bank of the Rhine in Kleinbasel. The younger line from Johann Petrus Merian (c.1468/1478 – after 1519) is thought to be related, as he was an episcopal steward who also came from Lüttelsdorf to Basel, but whether Theobald (the son) and Johann Petrus were brothers and both therefore sons of Theobald (the father) as tradition claims, is unproven.

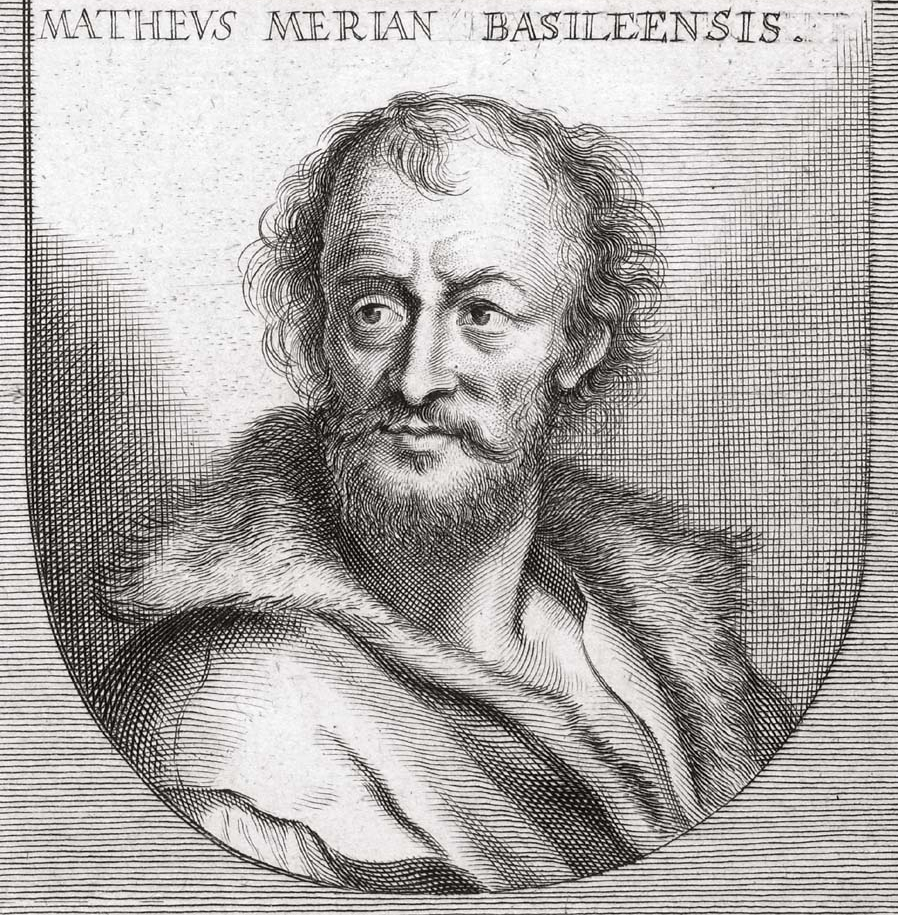
Swiss-born engraver and publisher Matthäus Merian (1593-1650)

== Frankfurt sub-branch ==
In 1624 the Swiss-born engraver Matthäus Merian (a descendant of the younger line) took over the Frankfurt publishing house of his father-in-law Johann Theodor de Bry, and in 1626 he acquired Frankfurt citizenship. His daughter Maria Sibylla Merian became a wlll respected illustrator. After the death of Matthäus Merian in 1650, two of his sons, Matthäus (the Younger) and Caspar, built up the publishing house under the name Matthäus Merian Seel. In 1687 the publishing house was inherited by a third generation family member, Johann Matthäus Merian (1659-1716), the second son of Matthäus the Younger. Johann's elder brother Carl Gustav Merian was later elevated to the nobility by the Elector of Mainz and appointed to the Privy Council. After Johann's death in 1716 the company was led by his niece Charlotte Maria Merian (1691-1729) until its dissolution in 1727. The Frankfurt family line died with the painter Carl Matthäus Merian (1705-1770), a great-grandson of Matthäus Merian (the Elder). The family name is remembered today in Frankfurt's Merianstrasse and Merianplatz, and in Merian School in Nordend.

== Significant family members ==
=== Elder Basel line ===
- Hans Bernhard (Jean-Bernard) Merian (1723–1807) - perpetual secretary of the Academy of Sciences at Berlin
- Christoph Merian (Senior) (1769-1849) - merchant and banker, seven-times-great-grandson of Theobald Merian (Junior).
- Philipp Merian (1773–1848) - merchant and philanthropist, brother of Christoph (Senior).
- Peter Merian (1795–1883) - professor of geology, brother of Johann Rudolf, second cousin of Christophe (Senior).
- Johann Rudolf Merian (1797–1871) - mathematician and politician, brother of Peter.
- Christoph Merian (1800–1858) - banker, businessman and agriculturalist, son of Christophe (Senior).

=== Younger Basel line (including Frankfurt sub-branch) ===
- Matthäus Merian the Elder (1593–1650) - engraver and publisher, great-grandson of Johann Petrus Merian.
- Matthäus Merian the Younger (1621–1687) - painter, engraver, publisher and bookseller.
- Caspar Merian (1627–1686) - landscape artist, son of Matthäus the Elder
- Anna Maria Sibylla Merian (1647–1717) - naturalist and illustrator, daughter of Matthäus the Elder
- Johann Matthäus von Merian (1659–1716) - pastel painter, son of Matthäus the Younger
- Johanna Helena Herolt (1668-1723) - painter, dtr. of Maria Sibylla Merian
- Dorothea Maria Graff (1678–1745) - dtr. of Maria Sibylla Merian, married painter Georg Gsell
- Andreas Merian-Iselin (1742–1811) - Basel politician and Swiss Landammann (chief magistrate).
- Andreas, baron von Merian (1772–1828) - Son of Andreas Merian-Iselin, diplomat in France and Russia
- Lukas Amadeus Merian (1808–1889) - Architect in Basel

== Merian family tree (younger Basel line) ==
Note: For the sake of simplicity, not all marriages, siblings and offspring have been included.

Theodor de Bry (1528-1598)
Johann Theodor de Bry (1561-1623)	Walther Merian (1558-1617)	Margaretha Falkner (1557-1629)
Merian family
Notable others	m.1617	m.1646	m.1651
Maria Magdalena de Bry (1598-1645)	Matthäus Merian the Elder (1593-1650)	Johanna Sibylla; Heim(ius) (c.1620-90)	Jacob Marrel (1614-1681)	Friedrich Merian (1595-1662)
Matthäus Merian der Jüngere (1621-1687)	Anthonetta Margaretha Bartels	Caspar Merian (1627-1686)	Joachim Merian (1635-1701)	Anna Maria Sibylla Merian (1647-1717)	Johann Andreas Graff (1637-1701)	Maximilian Merian (died young)	Matthäus Merian (1625-1702)
Carl Gustav Merian (1655-1707)	Johann Matthäus von Merian (1659-1716)	Daniel Merian (1672-1743)	Jacob Hendrik Herolt	Johanna Helena (Graff) Herolt (1668-1723)	Philipp Hendriks (1671-1711)	Dorothea Maria Graff (1678-1743)	Georg Gsell (1673-1740)	Andreas Merian (1659-1725)
m.1776	m.1734
Marie Charlotte Merian (1691-1729)	Johann Friedrich Eosander von Göthe (1669-1728)	Carl Matthäus Merian (1705-1770)	Salome Abigail Gsell (1723-1794)	Leonhard Euler (1707-1783)	Katharina Gsell (1707-1773)	Andreas Merian (1694-1776)
Margaretha Iselin (1749-1814)	Andreas Merian-Iselin (1742-1811)
