= Maria Sibylla Merian =

German naturalist and artist (1647–1717)

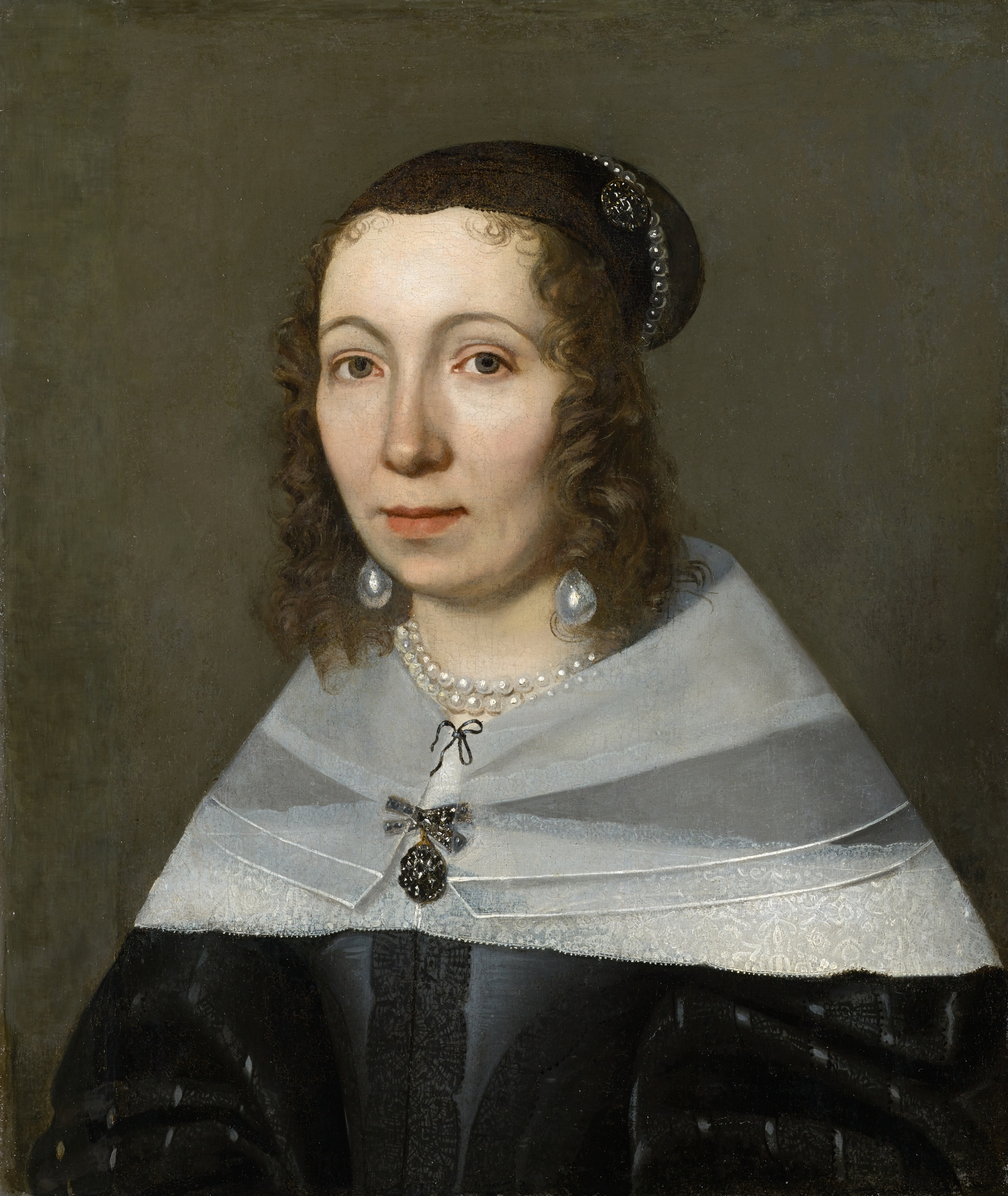
- Portrait by Jacob Marrel, 1679 (Kunstmuseum Basel)
- Born: 2 April 1647; Free Imperial City of Frankfurt, Holy Roman Empire
- Died: 13 January 1717 (aged 69); Amsterdam, Dutch Republic
- Occupations: Naturalist; biological illustrator
- Known for: Documentation of butterfly metamorphosis; scientific illustration
- Spouse: Johann Andreas Graff (m. 1665)
- Children: Johanna Helena; Dorothea Maria
- Father: Matthäus Merian the Elder
- Relatives: Matthäus Merian the younger

Maria Sibylla Merian (2 April 1647 – 13 January 1717) was a German-Dutch entomologist, naturalist, and scientific illustrator. She was one of the earliest European naturalists to document observations about insects directly; her work established that insects have a life cycle and do not appear by spontaneous generation. Merian was a descendant of the Frankfurt branch of the Swiss Merian family.

Merian received her artistic training from her stepfather, Jacob Marrel, a student of the still life painter Georg Flegel. Merian published her first book of natural illustrations in 1675. She had started to collect insects as an adolescent. At age 13, she raised silkworms. In 1679, Merian published the first volume of a two-volume series on caterpillars; the second volume followed in 1683. Each volume contained 50 plates that she engraved and etched. Merian documented evidence on the process of metamorphosis and the plant hosts of 186 European insect species. Along with the illustrations Merian included descriptions of their life cycles.

In 1699, Merian travelled to Dutch Guiana to study and record the tropical insects native to the region. In 1705, she published Metamorphosis Insectorum Surinamensium. Merian's Metamorphosis has been credited with influencing a range of naturalist illustrators. Because of her careful observations and documentation of the metamorphosis of the butterfly, Merian is considered by David Attenborough to be among the more significant contributors to the field of entomology. She discovered many new facts about insect life through her studies. Until her careful, detailed work, it had been thought that insects were "born of mud" by spontaneous generation. Her pioneering research in illustrating and describing the various stages of development, from egg to larva to pupa and finally to adult, dispelled the notion of spontaneous generation and established the idea that insects undergo distinct and predictable life cycles.

== Life and career ==
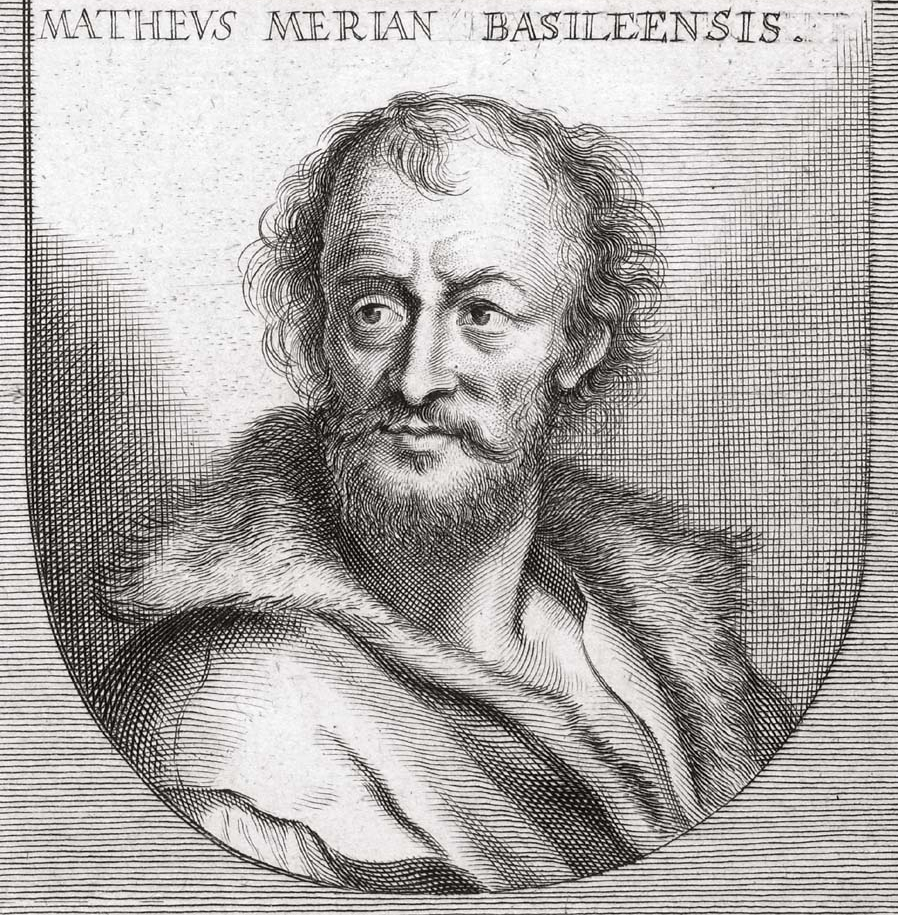
Her father, Matthäus Merian, was an engraver and ran a publishing house. He was a member of the patrician Basel Merian family.

Maria Sibylla Merian's father, the Swiss engraver and publisher Matthäus Merian the Elder, married her mother, his second wife, Johanna Sybilla Heyne, in 1646. Maria was born within the next year, making her his ninth child. Her father died in 1650, and in 1651, her mother remarried Jacob Marrel, the flower and still life painter. Marrel encouraged Merian to draw and paint. While he lived mostly in Holland, his pupil Abraham Mignon trained her. At the age of 13, she painted her first images of insects and plants from specimens she had captured. Early on, she had access to many books about natural history. Regarding her youth, in the foreword to Metamorphosis Insectorum Surinamensium, Merian wrote:

I spent my time investigating insects. At the beginning, I started with silkworms in my home town of Frankfurt. I realised that other caterpillars produced beautiful butterflies or moths, and that silkworms did the same. This led me to collect all the caterpillars I could find in order to see how they changed.

In May 1665, Merian married Marrel's apprentice, Johann Andreas Graff from Nuremberg; his father was a poet and director of the local high school, one of the leading schools in seventeenth-century Germany. In January 1668, she had her first child, Johanna Helena, and the family moved to Nuremberg in 1670, her husband's home town. While living there, Merian continued painting, working on parchment and linen, and creating designs for embroidery. She also gave drawing lessons to unmarried daughters of wealthy families (her "Jungferncompaney", i.e. virgin group), which helped her family financially and increased its social standing. This provided her with access to the finest gardens, maintained by the wealthy and elite, where she could continue collecting and documenting insects. In 1675, Merian was included in Joachim von Sandrart's German Academy. Aside from painting flowers she made copperplate engravings. After attending Sandrart's school she published flower pattern books. In 1678, she gave birth to her second daughter Dorothea Maria.

Other women still-life painters, such as Merian's contemporary Margaretha de Heer, included insects in their floral pictures, but did not breed or study them. In 1679, she published her first work on insects, the first of a two-volume illustrated book focusing on insect metamorphosis.

In 1678, the family had moved to Frankfurt am Main, but her marriage was an unhappy one. She moved in with her mother after her stepfather died in 1681. In 1683, she travelled to Gottorp and was attracted to the Labadists' community in Holstein. In 1685, Merian travelled with her mother, husband, and children to Friesland in the Netherlands, where her half-brother Caspar Merian had lived since 1677.

=== Friesland ===
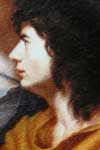
Her brother Caspar Merian

From 1685 onward, Merian, her daughters, and her mother lived with the Labadist community, which had settled on the grounds of a stately home – Walt(h)a Castle – at Wieuwerd in Friesland. They stayed there for three years, during which Merian found time to study natural history and Latin — then the language of scientific publication. In the moors of Friesland, she observed the birth and development of frogs, collecting specimens for dissection. Merian stayed with the community until 1691.

In Wieuwerd, the Labadists engaged in printing and many other occupations, including farming and milling. At its peak, the religious community numbered around 600, with many more adherents further afield. Visitors came from England, Italy, Poland, and elsewhere, but not all approved of the strict discipline, religious separatism, and community property. Merian's husband was refused by the Labadists, but came back twice.

=== Amsterdam ===
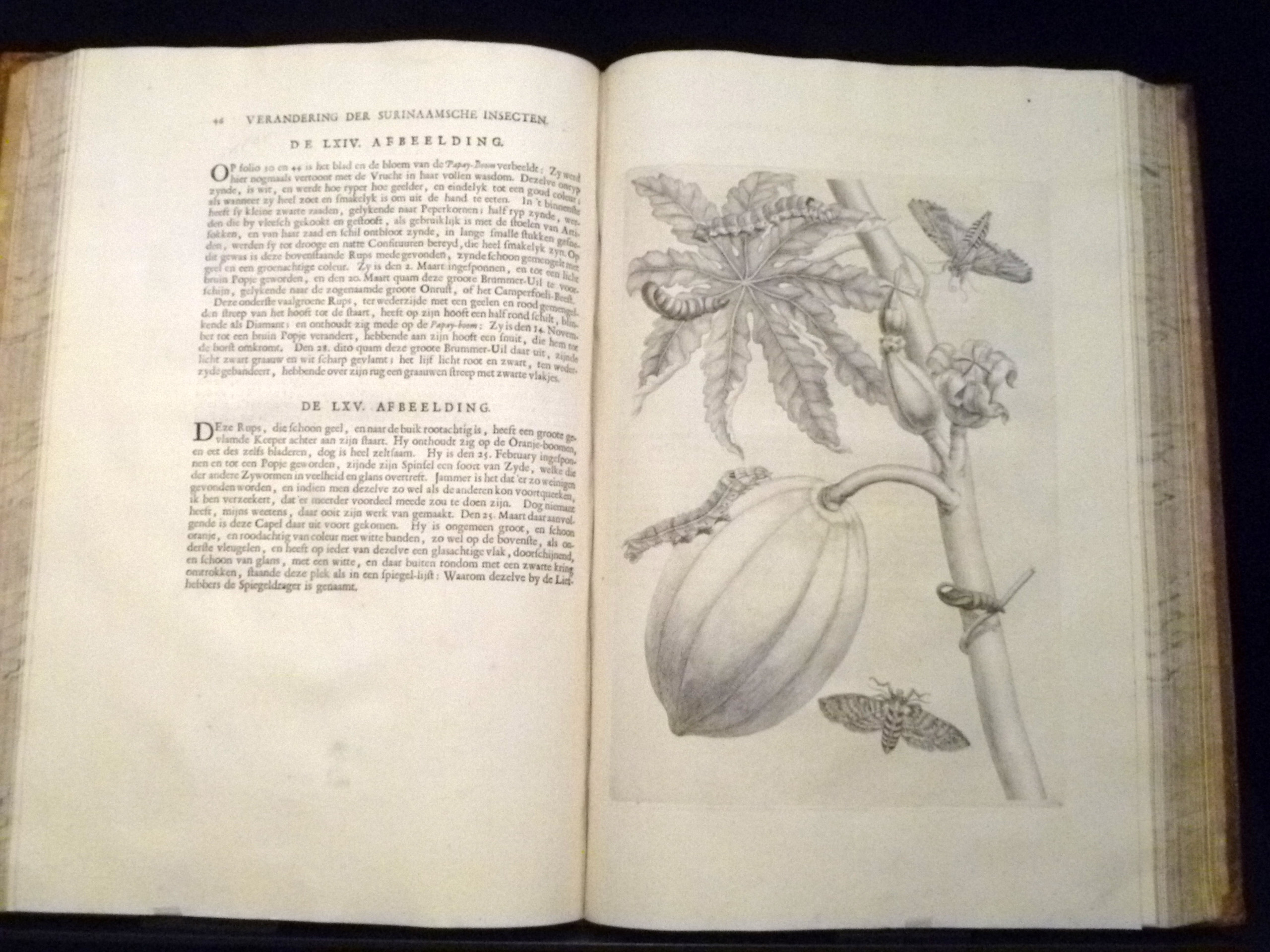
A 1730 black and white edition of Metamorphosis – after her death the book was reprinted in 1719, 1726, and 1730.

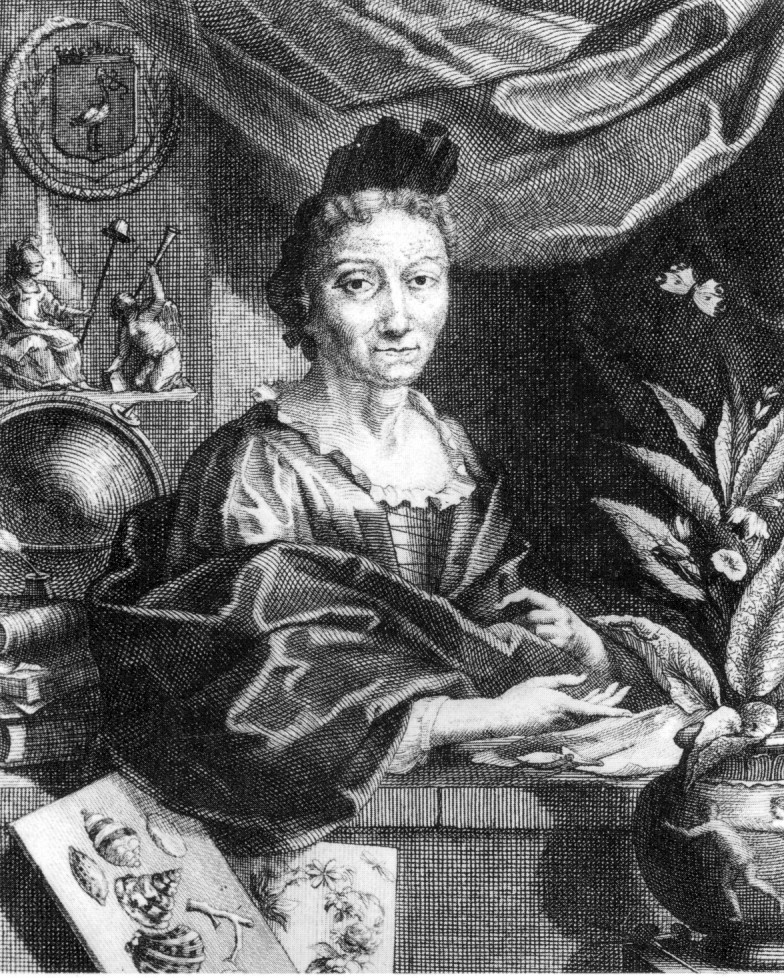
An occupational portrait of Maria Sibylla Merian (c. 1700, copperplate by Jacobus Houbraken from a portrait by Georg Gsell). Her status as a scientist is emphasised by the pile of books next to her. The globe and the prints draw attention to her accomplishments. The pair of engraving burins and the emblem of her father emphasise her ancestry.

In 1690, Merian's mother had died. A year later, she moved with her daughters to Amsterdam. In 1692, her husband divorced her. In Amsterdam the same year, her daughter Johanna married Jakob Hendrik Herolt, a successful merchant in the Suriname trade, originally from Bacharach. The flower painter Rachel Ruysch became Merian's pupil. Merian made a living selling her paintings. She and her daughter Johanna sold flower pictures to art collector Agnes Block. By 1698 Merian lived in a well-furnished house on Kerkstraat.

In 1699, the city of Amsterdam granted Merian permission to travel to Suriname in South America, along with her younger daughter Dorothea Maria. On 10 July, the fifty-two year old Merian and her daughter set sail. The goal of the mission was to spend five years illustrating new species of insects. In order to finance the mission, Maria Sibylla sold 255 of her own paintings. She would later write:

In Holland, with much astonishment what beautiful animals came from the East and West Indies. I was blessed with having been able to look at both the expensive collection of Doctor Nicolaes Witsen, mayor of Amsterdam and director of the East Indies society, and that of Mr. Jonas Witsen, secretary of Amsterdam. Moreover, I also saw the collections of Mr. Fredericus Ruysch, doctor of medicine and professor of anatomy and botany, Mr. Livinus Vincent, and many other people. In these collections I had found innumerable other insects, but found that their origin and their reproduction is unknown, it begs the question as to how they transform, starting from caterpillars and chrysalises and so on. All this has, at the same time, led me to undertake a long-dreamed-of journey to Suriname.

=== Suriname and return to Netherlands ===
Merian arrived on 18 September or 19 September in Suriname, and met with the governor Paulus van der Veen. She worked for two years, travelling throughout the colony and sketching local animals and plants. She recorded local native names for the plants and described local uses.

Unlike other Dutch naturalists, Merian was not employed by a commercial enterprise or corporation. The preface of her Suriname book does not acknowledge any patrons or sponsors of her trip. Some believe her journey may have been financed by the directors of the Dutch West India Company. In her subsequent publication on the expedition Merian criticised the actions of the colonial merchants, saying that "the people there have no desire to investigate anything like that; indeed they mocked me for seeking anything other than sugar in the country." Merian also condemned the merchants' treatment of slaves. An enslaved person was forced to assist Merian in her research, and the labour of this person enabled interactions she had with the Amerindian and African slaves in the colony who assisted her in researching the plants and animals of Suriname. Merian also took an interest in agriculture and lamented the colonial merchants' resistance to plant or export anything other than sugar. She later showcased the vegetables and fruits that could be found in Suriname, including the pineapple.

In June 1701 an illness, possibly malaria, forced her to return to the Dutch Republic. Back in the Netherlands Merian opened a shop. She sold specimens she had collected and her engravings of plant and animal life in Suriname. In 1705, she published a book Metamorphosis Insectorum Surinamensium about the insects of Suriname.

In 1715, Merian suffered a stroke. Despite being partially paralysed, she continued her work. She died in Amsterdam on 13 January 1717 and was buried four days later at Leidse kerkhof. Although she is sometimes described as dying impoverished, her funeral was a middle-class one with fourteen pall-bearers. Her daughter Dorothea published Erucarum Ortus Alimentum et Paradoxa Metamorphosis, a collection of her mother's work, after Merian's death.

== Work ==
=== Botanical art ===
Merian first made a name for herself as a botanical artist. In 1675, she started to publish a three-volume series, each with twelve plates depicting flowers. In 1680 she published Neues Blumenbuch, combining the series.

The drawings were decorative and not all were drawn based on observation. Some of the flowers in the three-volume series appear to be based on drawings by Nicolas Robert and her stepfather Jacob Marrel. Merian included insects among the flowers; again she may not have observed them all herself, and some may be copies of drawings by Jacob Hoefnagel. The single flowers, wreaths, nosegays and bouquets in the three volumes would provide patterns for artists and embroiderers. Embroidery was at the time an essential part of the education that privileged young women received in Europe. Copying from other artists was an essential part of an artist's training at the time. Her compositions resemble the compartment style of the scrolling stem embroidery designs that were common in Europe at the time. Butterflies and damselflies interplayed with plants, reflecting the decorative compositions of Hoefnagel. Her subsequent Raupen books would also be used as patterns for paintings, drawings and sewing.

Merian also sold hand-coloured editions of the Blumenbuch series. Merian's process of creating her art used vellum which she primed with a white coat. Because of the guild system women were not allowed to paint in oil. Merian painted with watercolours and gouache instead.

=== Research into insects and caterpillars ===
Title page of The Caterpillars' Marvellous Transformation and Strange Floral Food, first volume, published 1679

Plate I of Caterpillars vol 1, entitled "Maulbeerbaum samt Frucht". It depicts the fruit and leave of a mulberry tree and the eggs and larvae of the silkworm moth.

Plate 5 of Caterpillars vol 1, depicting the metamorphosis of the garden tiger moth, its plant host, and parasitic wasps.

Merian was one of the early naturalists to observe insects directly. Merian collected and observed live insects and created detailed drawings. In her time insects still had a reputation as "beasts of the devil" and the process of metamorphosis was largely unknown. While a handful of scholars had published empirical information on the insect, moth and butterfly life cycle, the widespread contemporary belief was that they were "born of mud" by spontaneous generation. Merian documented evidence to the contrary and described the life cycles of 186 insect species.

Merian had started to collect insects as an adolescent and kept a study journal. Aged 13, she raised silkworms and other insects. Her interest turned to moths and butterflies, which she collected and studied. While living in Nuremberg and Frankfurt Merian would travel to the surrounding countryside to search for caterpillars. She recorded their food plants, the timing of their metamorphoses, and noted the behaviour she observed. It was not unusual for naturalists to illustrate their own research, but Merian was among the early professionally trained artists to illustrate her lifelong studies and observations.

She observed the life cycles of insects over decades, making detailed drawings based on live insects in their natural environment or freshly preserved specimens. This set her apart from previous artist-naturalists such as Conrad Gesner. Her drawings and engraved plates depict moths laying eggs, or caterpillars feeding on leaves. By drawing live insects Merian could accurately depict colours, which were lost from preserved specimens. The plates she eventually published are complex compositions, based on detailed studies of individual insects she painted on vellum; many are preserved in her study journal. A comparison shows that she changed little and preserved the posture and colour of insects when placing them into the larger composition of her plates. In the course of her insect studies she also recorded and painted the reproductive cycle of flowers, from bud through fruit. As a trained artist Merian was concerned with colour accuracy and in Metamorphosis she recorded the plants from which pigments could be derived. The engravings she produced or supervised are little different from her original watercolours. She also hand-coloured some engravings.

In 1679, Merian published the first volume of a two-volume series on caterpillars, with a second volume in 1683. Each volume contained 50 plates engraved and etched by Merian, with a description of the insects, moths, butterflies and their larvae she had observed. Der Raupen wunderbare Verwandlung und sonderbare Blumennahrung – The Caterpillars' Marvellous Transformation and Strange Floral Food, was very popular in certain segments of high society as it was written in the vernacular, but her work was largely ignored by scientists of the time.

The title page of her 1679 Caterpillars proudly proclaimed in German:

"wherein by means of an entirely new invention the origin, food and development of caterpillars, worms, butterflies, moths, flies and other such little animals, including times, places and characteristics, for naturalists, artists, and gardeners, are diligently examined, briefly described, painted from nature, engraved in copper and published independently."

Jan Goedart had described and depicted the life stages of European moths and butterflies before her, but Merian's "invention" was the detailed study of species, their life-cycle and habitat. Goedart had documented species by depicting one adult, a pupa and one larva. Merian depicted the physical differences between male and female adults, showed wings in different positions and the different colouring on each side of the wing. She also documented the extended proboscis of feeding insects. The first plate in her 1679 Caterpillars detailed the life cycle of the silkworm moth. Starting in the right-hand corner with eggs, progressing with a hatching larva and several moults of the growing larva. Goedart had not included eggs in his images of the life stages of European moths and butterflies, because he had believed that caterpillars were generated from water. When Merian published her study of insects, it was widely believed that insects were spontaneously generated. Merian's discoveries were made independently of, and supported, the findings of Francesco Redi, Marcello Malpighi and Jan Swammerdam.

While Merian's depiction of insects' life cycle was innovative in its accuracy, it was her observations on the interaction of organisms that are now regarded as a major contribution to the modern science of ecology. The depiction of insects and their plant hosts set Merian's work apart from that of the classic by Swammerdam and Francis Willughby as well as the work of her countrymen and contemporaries such as Georg Rumphius. Merian was the first to show that each stage of the change from caterpillar to butterfly depended on a small number of plants for its nourishment. She noted that as a consequence the eggs were laid near these plants. In her description she commented on the environmental factors that influenced the growth of insects. On caterpillars she noted that the size of their larvae increased by the day if they had enough food. "Some then attain their full size in several weeks; others can require up to two months."

Among her more significant contribution to science is the pairing of each larval lepidopteran, which she observed with a plant on which it feeds. She collected and kept caterpillars and conducted experiments to confirm her observations. She noted "caterpillars which fed on one flowering plant only, would feed on that one alone, and soon died if I did not provide it for them." She documented that some caterpillars would feed on more than one plant, but some only did so if they were deprived of their preferred host plant.

Merian in her detailed studies made several other unique observations. In relation to larvae, she recorded that "many shed their skins completely three or four times". She illustrated this with a drawing showing a shed exoskeleton. She also detailed the ways in which larvae formed their cocoons, the possible effects of climate on their metamorphosis and numbers, their mode of locomotion, and the fact that when caterpillars "have no food, they devour each other". Such information was recorded by Merian for specific species.

=== Research in Suriname ===
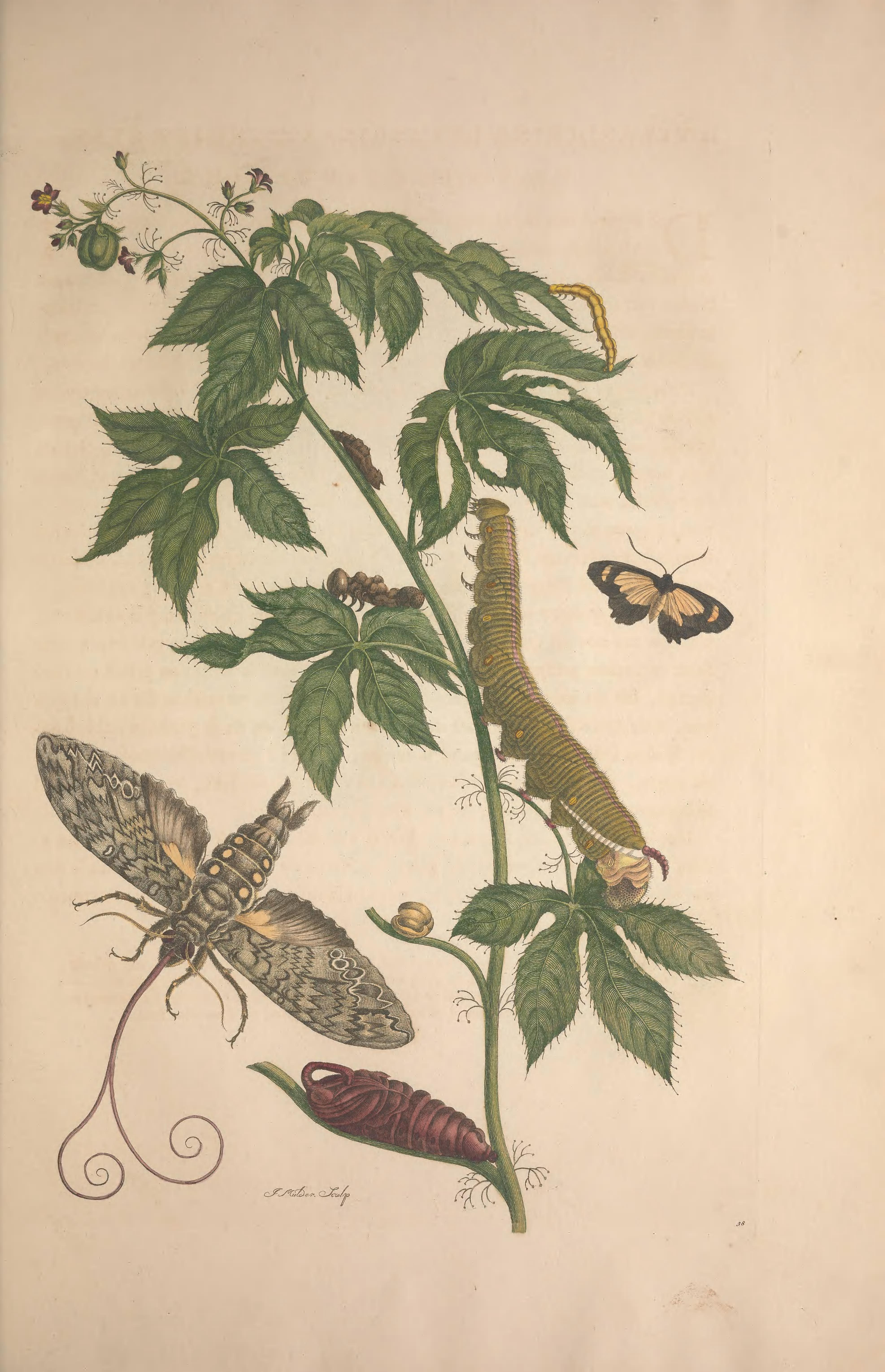
Plate showing the stages of the Cocytius antaeus from Metamorphosis insectorum Surinamensium

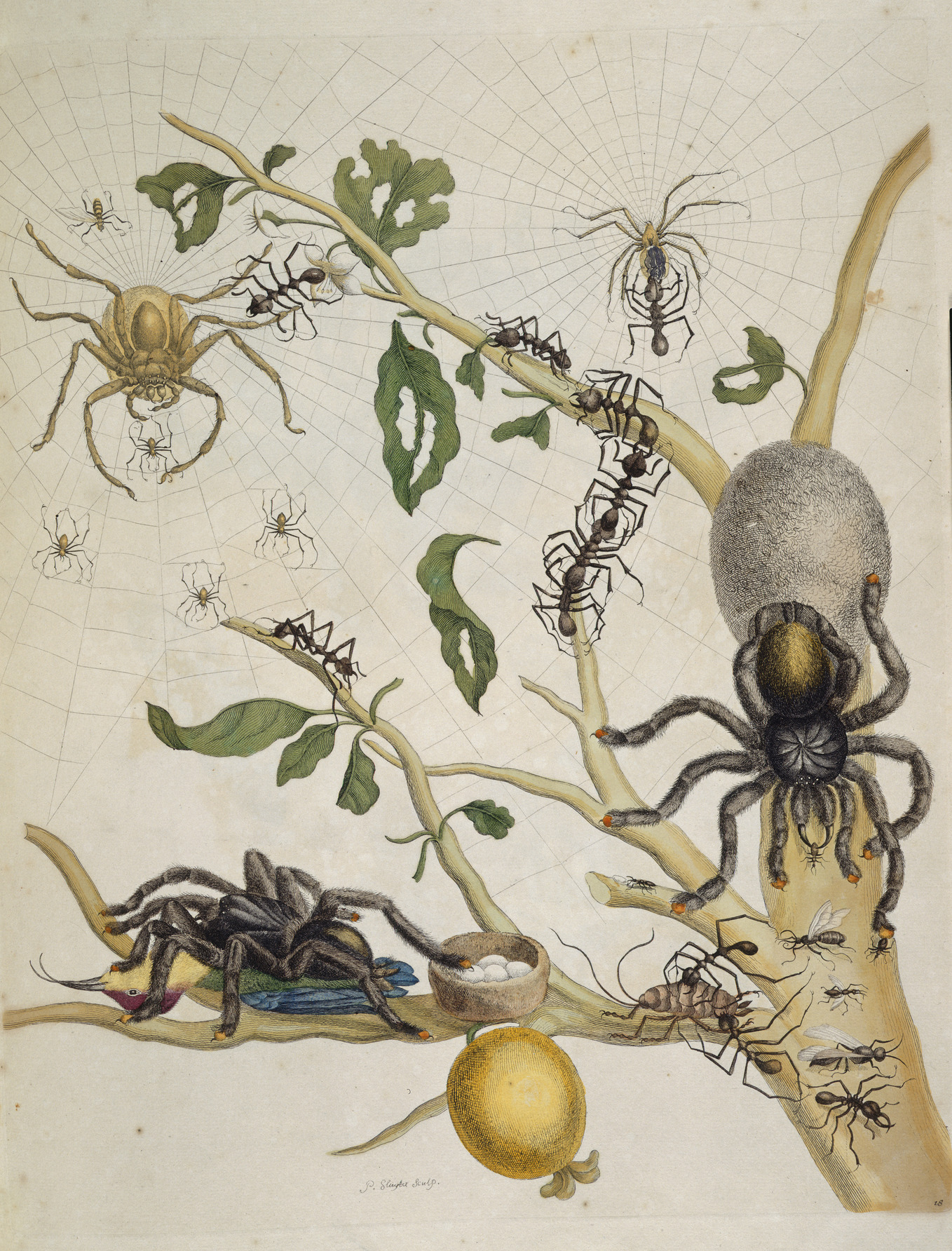
Coloured copper engraving from Metamorphosis, "Spiders, ants and hummingbird on a branch of a guava". The spider in the bottom left corner is eating a bird.

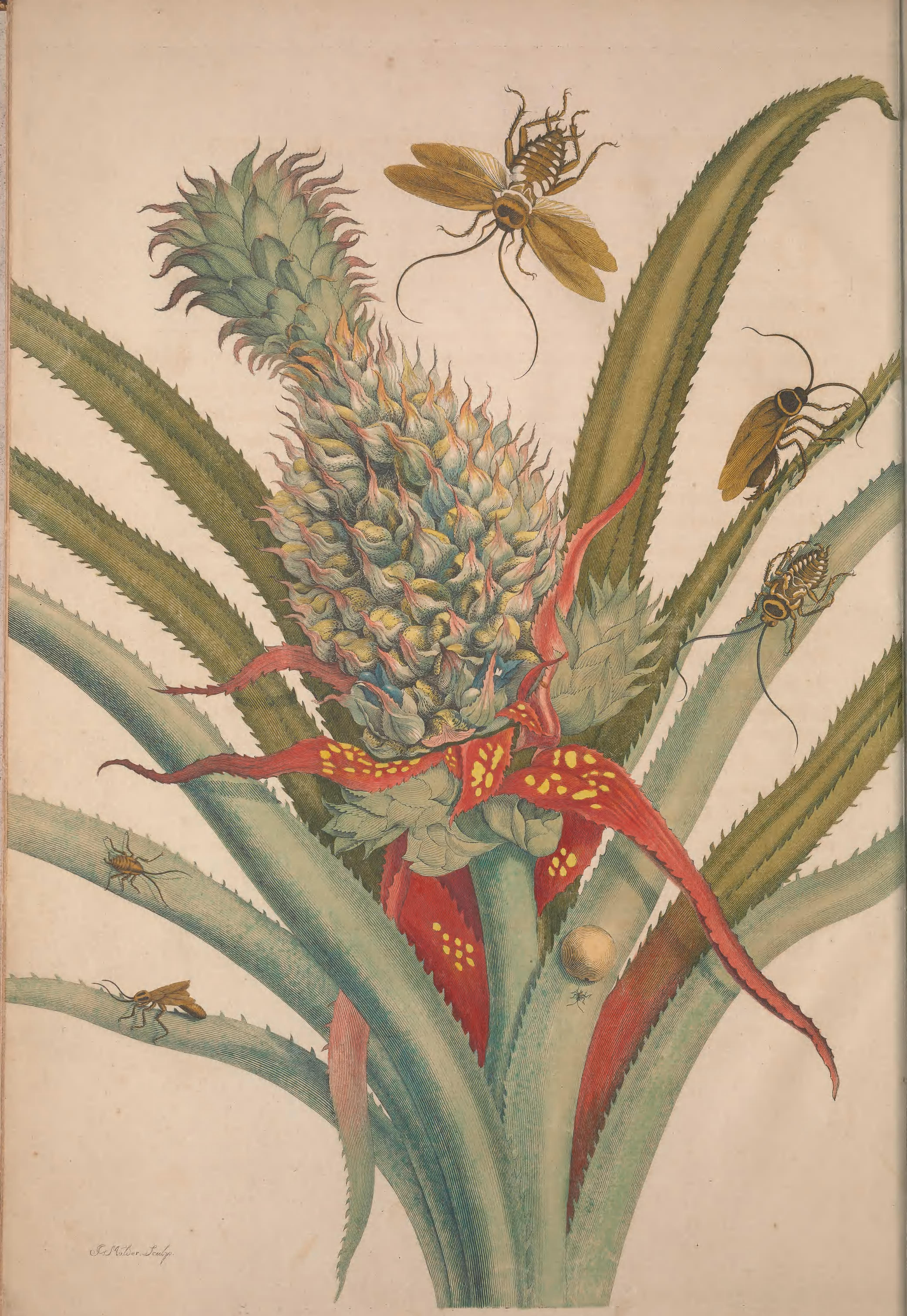
Plate 1 of Metamorphosis, showing a pineapple and cockroaches

In 1699, Merian travelled to Dutch Surinam to study and record the tropical insects. The pursuit of her work in Suriname was an unusual endeavour, especially for a woman. In general, only men received royal or government funding to travel in the colonies to find new species of plants and animals, make collections and work there, or settle. Scientific expeditions at this period of time were not common, and Merian's self-funded expedition raised many eyebrows. She succeeded, however, in discovering a whole range of previously unknown animals and plants in the interior of Suriname. Merian spent time studying and classifying her findings and described them in great detail. She not only described the insects she found, but also noted their habitat, habits and uses to indigenous people. Her classification of butterflies and moths is still relevant today. She used Native American names to refer to the plants, which became used in Europe:

I created the first classification for all the insects which had chrysalises, the daytime butterflies and the nighttime moths. The second classification is that of the maggots, worms, flies, and bees. I retained the indigenous names of the plants, because they were still in use in America by both the locals and the Indians.

Merian's drawings of plants, frogs, snakes, spiders, iguanas, and tropical beetles are still collected today by amateurs all over the world. The German word Vogelspinne – (a spider of the infraorder Mygalomorphae), translated literally as bird spider – probably has its origins in an engraving by Merian. The engraving, created from sketches drawn in Suriname, shows a large spider who had just captured a bird. In the same engraving and accompanying text Merian was the first European to describe both army ants and leaf cutter ants as well as their effect on other organisms. Merian's depictions of tropical ants were subsequently cited and copied by other artists. Her depictions of the struggle among organisms predate Charles Darwin and Alfred Russel Wallace's theories on the struggle for survival and evolution.

In 1705, three years after returning from her expedition, she published Metamorphosis insectorum Surinamensium. The publication was a large volume containing 60 engraved plates after Merian's designs, showing insect life cycles together with plants and animals from Suriname.Metamorphosis first was published at her own expense. Merian had returned from Suriname with sketches and notes. As the word spread among scholars in Amsterdam, visitors came to view her paintings of exotic insects and plants. She noted "Now that I had returned to Holland and several nature-lovers had seen my drawings, they pressured me eagerly to have them printed. They were of the opinion that this was the first and most unusual work ever painted in America." With the assistance of her daughters Johanna and Dorothea, Merian put together a series of plates. She did not make the printing plates herself this time, but hired three printmakers to do the engraving. She supervised the work closely. To pay for this work she advertised for subscribers, who were willing to give her money in advance for a hand-painted deluxe edition of the Metamorphosis. Twelve subscribers paid in advance to receive the expensive hand-painted edition, while a less expensive printed edition in black and white was also published. A technical study of surviving copies shows that some deluxe versions used hand-coloured counterproofs, a process that softened the printed outlines and made the plants and insects appear closer to Merian's watercolour and gouache models. After her death the book was reprinted in 1719, 1726 and 1730, finding a larger audience. It was published in German, Dutch, Latin and French. Merian contemplated publishing the book in English, with the intention of presenting it to Queen Anne. She mused, "It is reasonable for a woman to make such a gift to a person of the same sex". However, nothing came of the plan.

Metamorphosis and the tropical ants Merian documented were cited by the scientists René Antoine, August Johann Rösel von Rosenhof, Mark Catesby and George Edwards. Merian's Metamorphosis has been credited with influencing a range of naturalist illustrators. Merian also documented the medicinal use of plants and animals by the people of Suriname. She documented among others that the sap from a palm was used rubbed into itchy scalps to treat worm infections. Merian also took an interest in agriculture and among the local fruit she showcased was the pineapple. When describing the pineapple Merian cited several standard works on natural history, which first had documented the fruit, such as Historia Naturalis Brasilae by Willem Piso and Georg Marggraf, Hortus Malabaricus by Hendrik van Rheede, and Medici Amstelodamensis by Caspar Commelin. While the pineapple had been drawn before, Merian's became the most prominent. She provided information on how the butterflies and cockroaches affected crops and agriculture in the colony. While documenting the botany of Suriname, Merian continued to record the metamorphosis of insects. Suriname's insects were shown throughout their entire life cycle and on their plant host.

A significant number of Merian's paintings combining a plant, caterpillar and butterfly are simply decorative, and make no attempt to describe the life cycle. For instance, the Gulf fritillary is shown with a vanilla plant, an orchid from the Americas, which is definitely not the host plant, and with the caterpillar of some other species. This problem recurs in many of her illustrations. An attempt to identify the insects and plants in a recent facsimile edition of her Suriname book was able to determine a number of species, although Merian usually gets the food plants wrong, makes numerous mistakes in depicting the morphology, and usually pairs the wrong species of caterpillar with its imago. Her drawings are part of the scientific exploration by Europeans. Early taxonomy of tropical plants relied on images or specimens. Following her return to Amsterdam the images she had made were used by Carl Linnaeus and others to identify one hundred or so new species. At the time there was no standardised scientific terminology to name plants and animals, so Merian used common everyday European words to describe Surinam's animals, such as silkworm or wasp. As such, she referred to butterflies as "summer birds". Linnaeus used Merian's drawings to describe 56 animals and 39 plants from Suriname, including the tarantula, in 1735 and 1753. In reference to her research, Linnaeus abbreviated her name into Mer.surin. for animals from Surinam, and Mer.eur. for European insects.

Merian was the first European woman to independently go on a scientific expedition in South America. In the 19th century Ida Pfeiffer, Alexine Tinne, Florence Baker, Mary French Sheldon, Mary Henrietta Kingsley and Marianne North followed in her footsteps and explored the natural world of Africa. Margaret Fountaine studied butterflies on five continents. Merian's scientific expedition of Surinam predated Alexander von Humboldt's famous South America expedition by 100 years, and that of Princess Theresa of Bavaria by 200 years. Merian's publication on her expedition was later identified as a key exponent of illustrated geographical publications originating in Holland in the late 17th century, which marketed an exotic but accessible New World to Europeans.

=== Scientific practice in Amsterdam ===
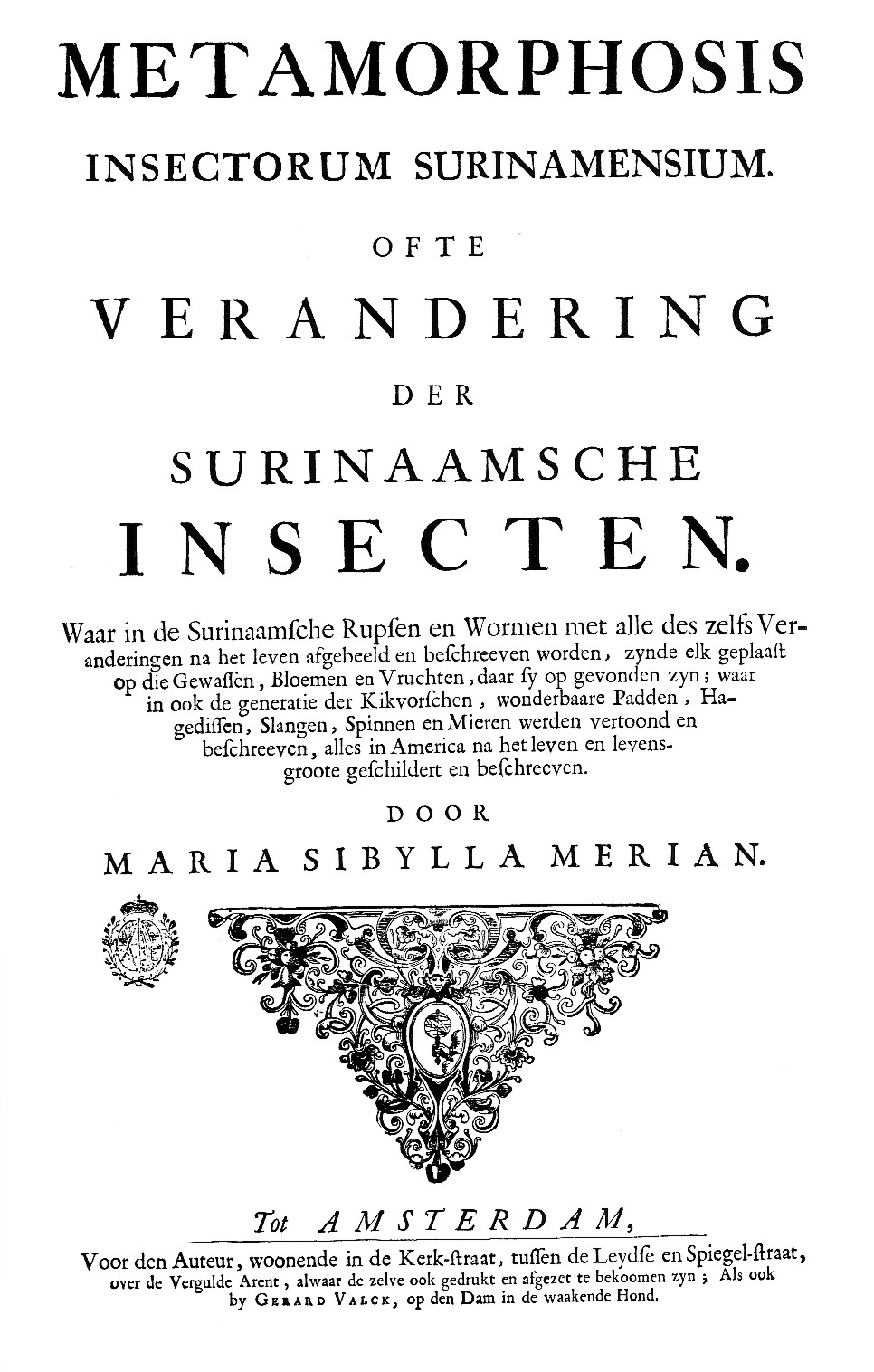
Merian's major work Metamorphosis insectorum Surinamensium

When Merian moved to Amsterdam in 1691, she made the acquaintance of several naturalists. Amsterdam was the centre of the Dutch Golden Age and a nexus for science, art and trade. When settling in, Merian found support from the artist Michiel van Musscher, who lived not far away. She took in students, one being Rachel Ruysch, daughter of the anatomist and physician Frederick Ruysch. Merian became an important figure among Amsterdam's botanists, scientists and collectors. Her Caterpillars books were getting noticed among the scientific community in England, she continued to breed caterpillars at home and ventured into the country side surrounding Amsterdam to study ants. Among her friends were the director of the Amsterdam Botanical Garden Caspar Commelin, the mayor of Amsterdam and president of the Dutch East India Company Nicolaes Witsen, the professor of medicine Fredericus Ruysch, and the merchant and collector Levinus Vincent.

Trading ships brought back never seen before shells, plants and preserved animals. But Merian was not interested in preserving, collecting, or studying specimens. When she received a specimen from the London apothecary James Petiver she wrote to him that she was interested in "the formation, propagation, and metamorphosis of creatures, how one emerges from the other, and the nature of their diet." Nevertheless, Merian accepted contract work. She helped to illustrate the book The Amboinese Curiosity Cabinet written by Georg Eberhard Rumpf. Rumpf was a naturalist and in the course of his work for the Dutch East India Company had collected Indonesian shells, rocks, fossils and sea animals. Merian, and possibly her daughter Dorothea, helped to compile illustrations of the specimens for the book, as Rumpf went blind from glaucoma and continued work on the book with assistants until 1690. It was published in 1705.

The exotic specimens on display in Amsterdam may have inspired her to travel to Surinam, but only interrupted her study of European insects briefly. Merian continued her collection and observation activities, adding plates to her Caterpillars books and updating the existing plates. She republished the two volumes in Dutch in 1713 and 1714 under the title Der Rupsen. She extended her studies into flies and rewrote the preface to her books to eradicate any mention of spontaneous generation. She explained that flies emerged from a caterpillar pupa, and suggested that flies could thereby be born from excrement. The 50 plates and descriptions of European insects that appear to have been intended for a third volume were published after her death by her daughters, who combined them with the 1713 editions to one large volume. A number of Metamorphosis editions were also published posthumously by her family, to which 12 additional plates were added. All but two appear to have been Merian's work.

Merian was described as lively, hard working and courteous by a visiting scholar in 1711. Her house was full of drawings, insects, plants, fruit, and on the walls were her Surinam watercolours. Shortly before Merian's death, her work was seen in Amsterdam by Peter the Great. After her death in 1717, he acquired a significant number of her paintings, which to this day are kept in academic collections in Saint Petersburg.

== Posthumous misattributions ==
Several scholars have traced mistakes that were falsely attributed to Merian after her death. One example revolves around who added colour to first edition plates of her Surinam book. Some first editions included plates that were painted by Merian and others had colourless plates. People later coloured in the black and white plates without following the colour palette used by Merian, similar to the concept of colouring books, and some suspect these later colours made it to the second edition. In another example, the printer of the 1730 edition of Surinam added plates using fictitious images of caterpillar life cycles that Merian did not originally include in the book and used for different, unscientific, purposes. Critics later cited these plates as proof to discredit Merian.

== Eponyms ==
Plate 8 of Caterpillars, first volume. Depicting a dandelion Taraxacum, with Dicallomera fascelina, the dark tussock moth. The Dutch common name for the moth Meriansborstel is named for Merian.

Long after her death a number of taxa, and two genera, were named after her. Three butterflies have been named after her, in 1905 a form of a split-banded owlet butterfly Opsiphanes cassina merianae; in 1967 a subspecies of the common postman butterfly Heliconius melpomene meriana; and in 2018 a rare butterfly Catasticta sibyllae from Panamá.

The Cuban sphinx moth has been named Erinnyis merianae. A Tessaratomidae bug has been named Plisthenes merianae. A genus of mantises has been named Sibylla. Also the orchid bee Eulaema meriana.

The bird-eating spider Avicularia merianae was named in her honour, referencing her research on spiders. The spider Metellina merianae was named after her in 2017. An Argentine tegu lizard has been named Salvator merianae. A toad was named Rhinella merianae. A snail was named Coquandiella meriana. The Madagascan population of the African stonechat bird was given the name Saxicola torquatus sibilla.

A genus of flowering plants was named Meriania. An iris-like plant was given the name Watsonia meriana.

== Modern appreciation ==
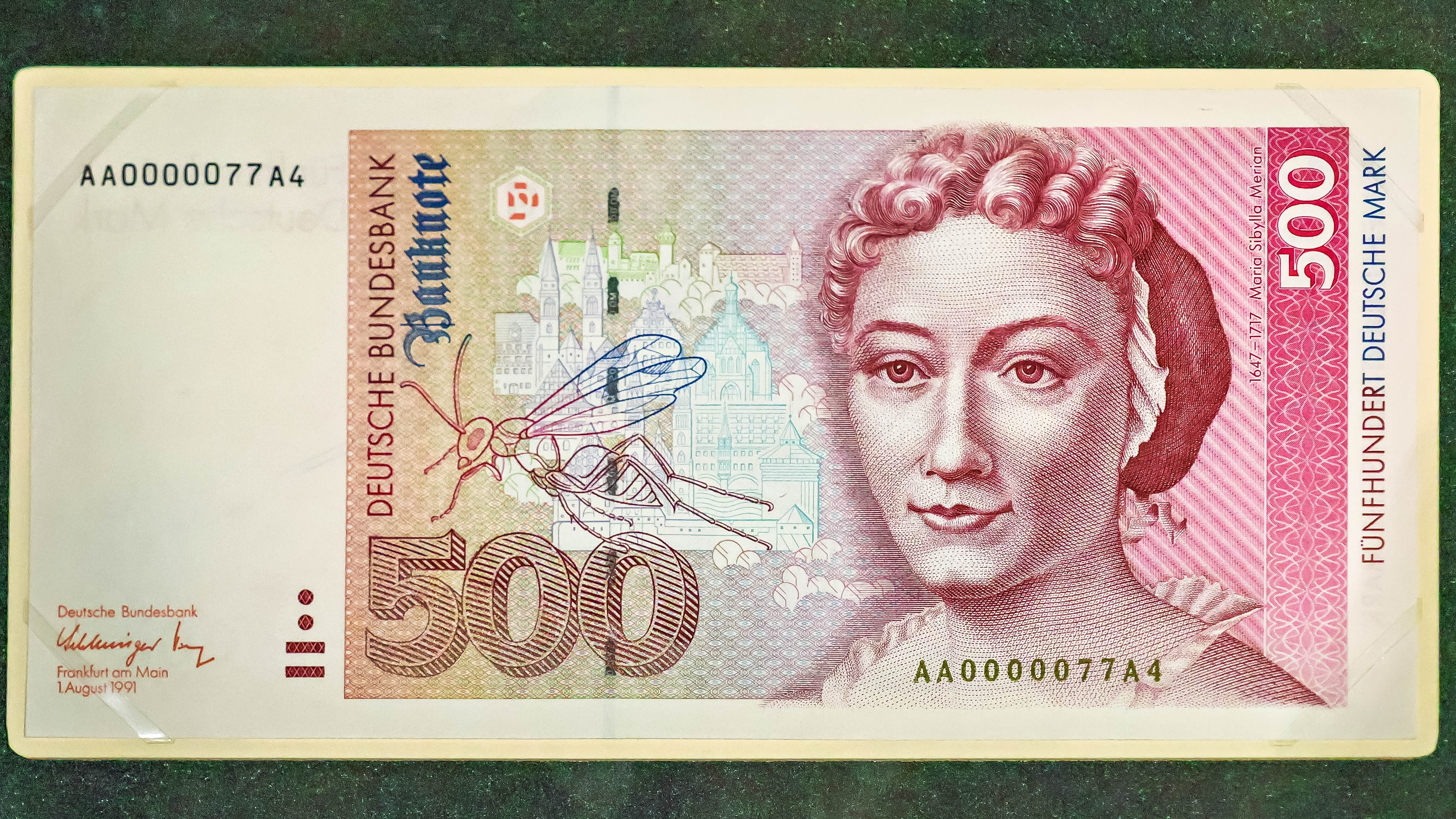
Portrait on the former 500 DM note

In the last quarter of the twentieth century, the work of Merian was re-evaluated, validated, and reprinted. Her portrait was printed on the 500 DM note before Germany converted to the euro. Her portrait has also appeared on a 0.40 DM stamp, released on 17 September 1987, and many schools are named after her. In the late 1980s the Archiv imprint of the Polydor label issued a series of new recordings of Wolfgang Amadeus Mozart's piano works performed on period instruments, and featuring Merian's floral illustrations. She was honoured with a Google Doodle on 2 April 2013 to mark her 366th birth anniversary.

The renewed scientific and artistic interest in her work was triggered in part by a number of scholars who examined collections of her works, such as the one in Rosenborg Castle, Copenhagen. In 2005, a modern research vessel named RV Maria S. Merian was launched at Warnemünde, Germany. In 2016, Merian's Metamorphosis insectorum Surinamensium was re-published with updated scientific descriptions and, in June 2017, a symposium was held in her honour in Amsterdam. In March 2017, the Lloyd Library and Museum in Cincinnati, Ohio hosted "Off the Page", an exhibition rendering many of Merian's illustrations as 3D sculptures with preserved insects, plants, and taxidermy specimens.

The Argentine black and white tegu (Salvator merianae), a type of large lizard, was named in honour of Merian after its discovery and classification.

In 2021-2022 Merian’s work was featured in the exhibition Women Artists and Patrons in the Natural Sciences, 1650–1800, at the Morgan Library & Museum.

Poet Jessy Randall's 2022 collection Mathematics for Ladies includes a poem honoring Merian.

In 2024, the Rijksmuseum acquired one of 67 known surviving first editions of Metamorphosis Insectorum Surinamensium.

=== Daughters ===
Today, while Merian has experienced reinvigorated fame in the eyes of the art and science communities, some of her work has now been re-attributed to her daughters Johanna and Dorothea; Sam Segal has re-attributed 30 of 91 folios in the British Museum.

== Gallery ==
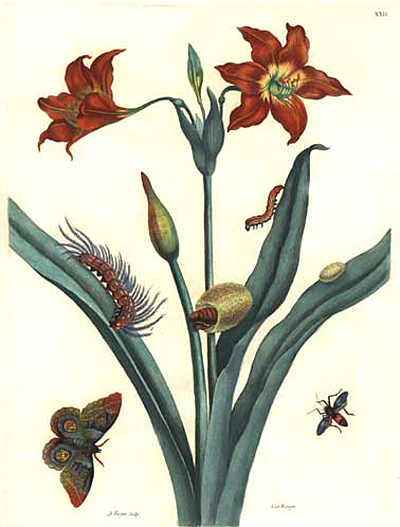

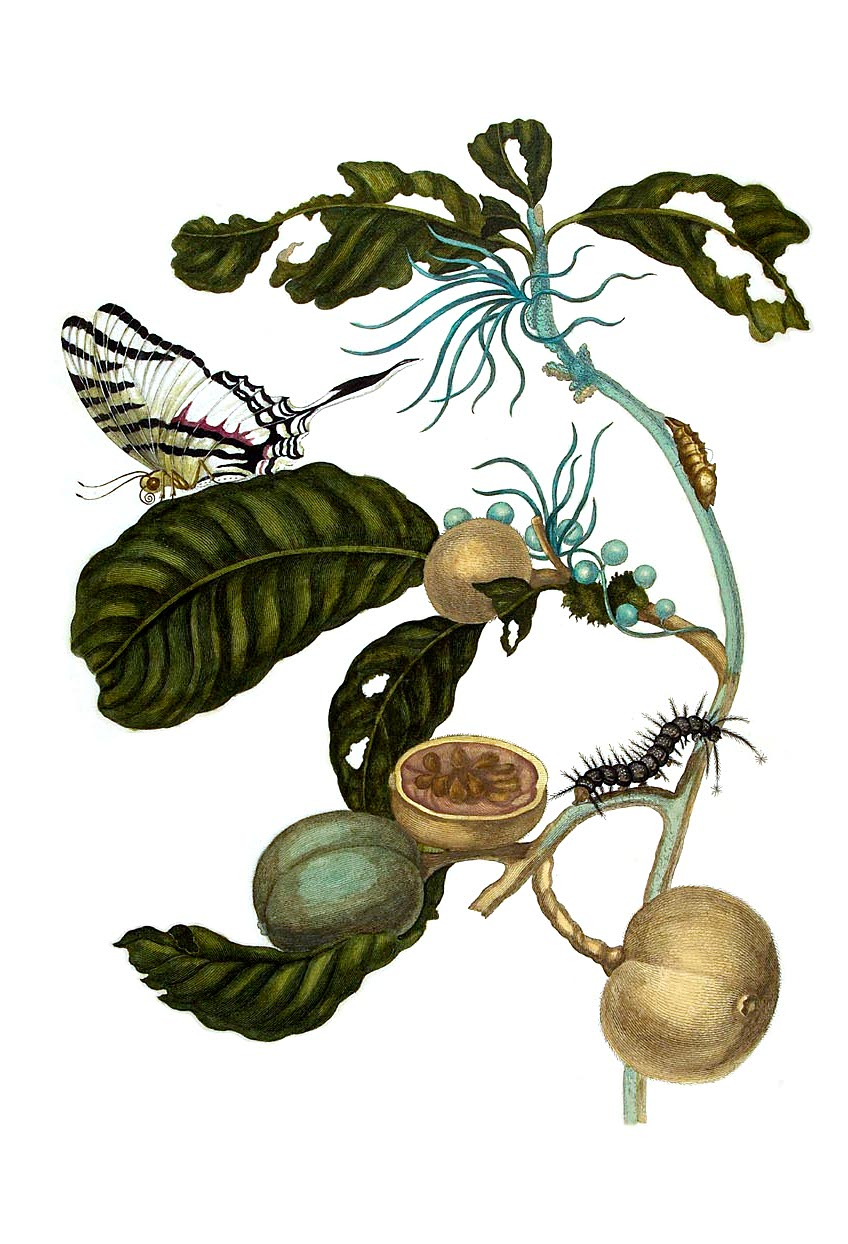

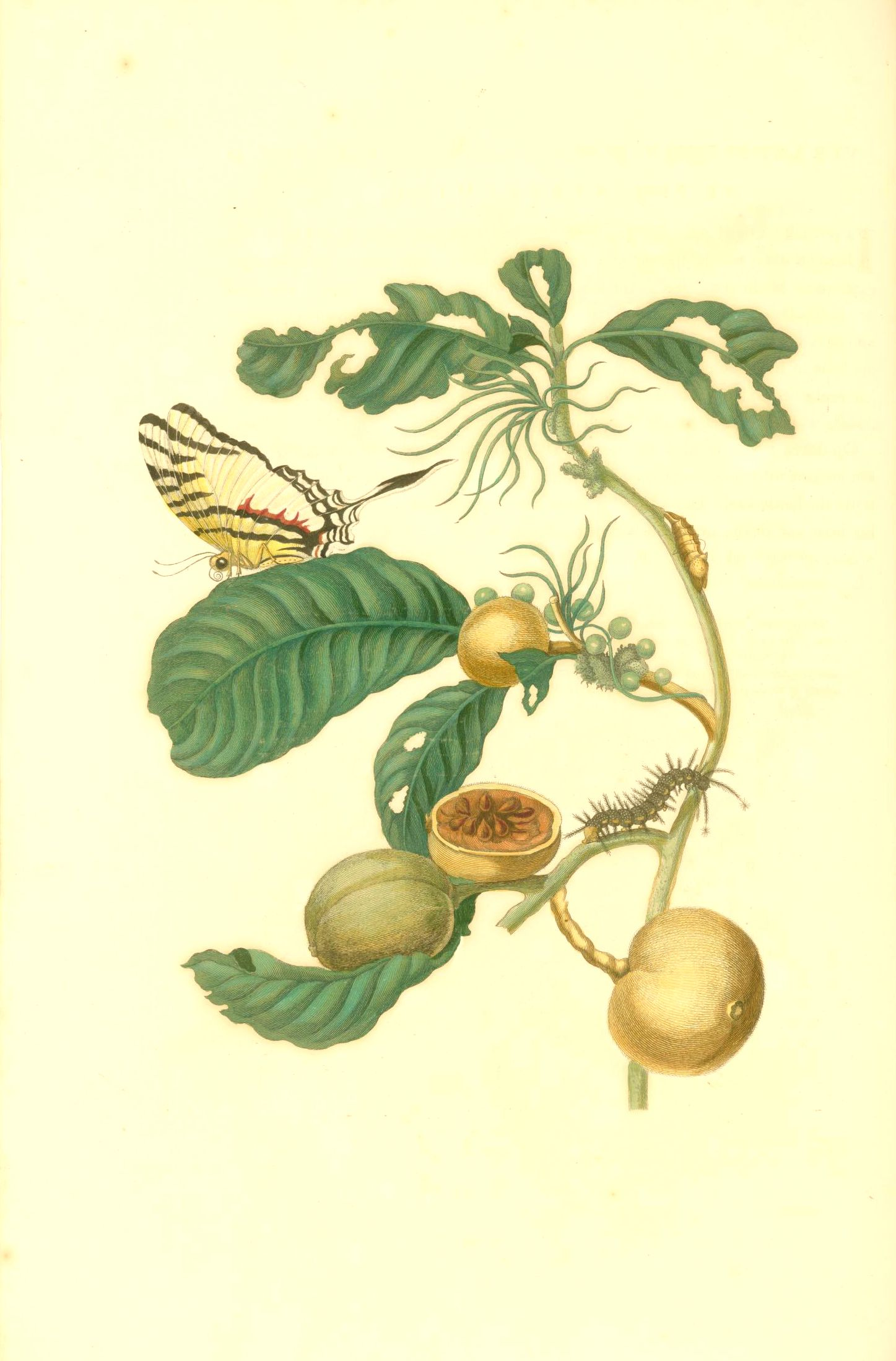

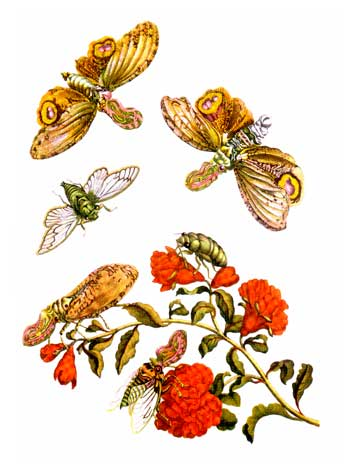

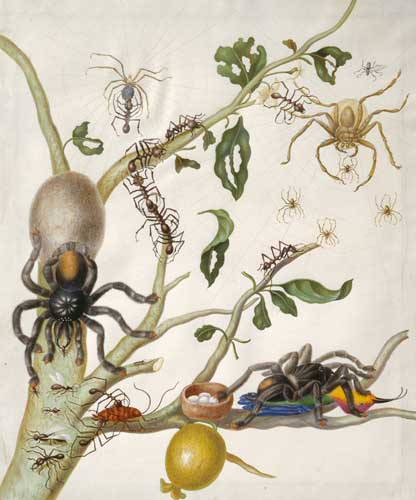

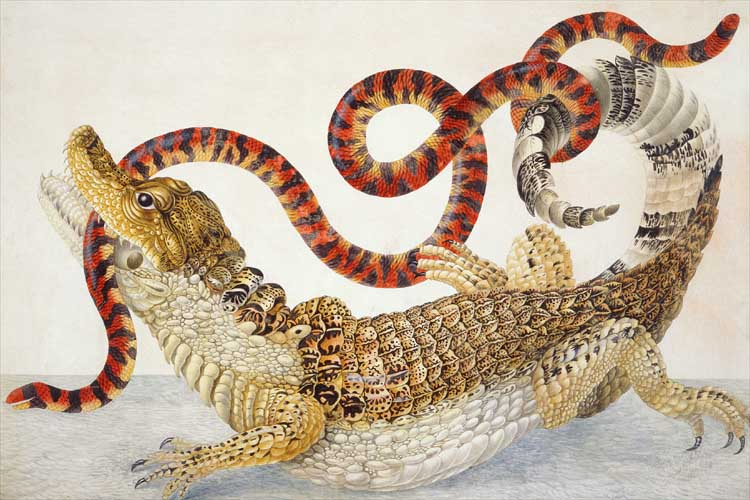

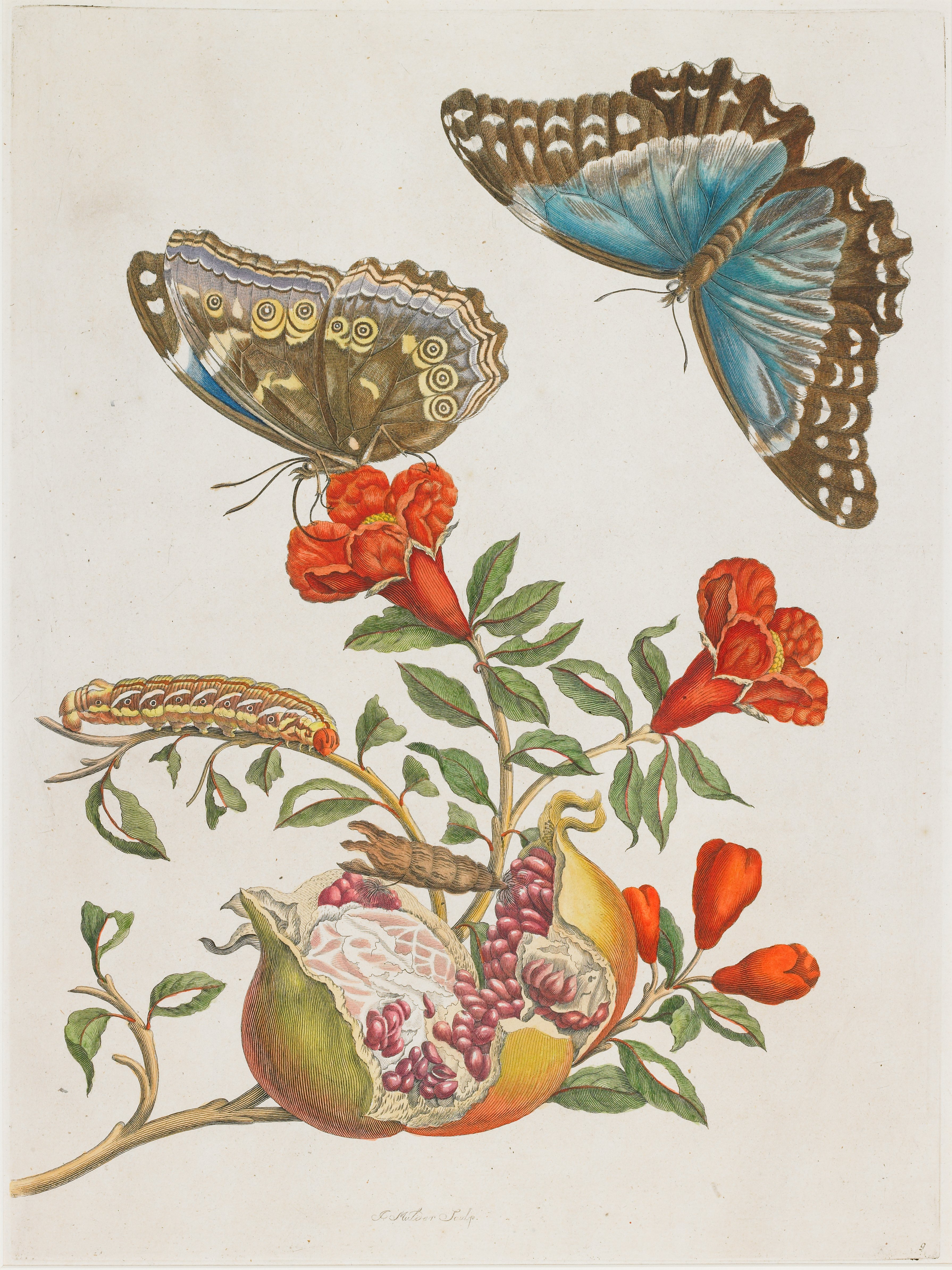

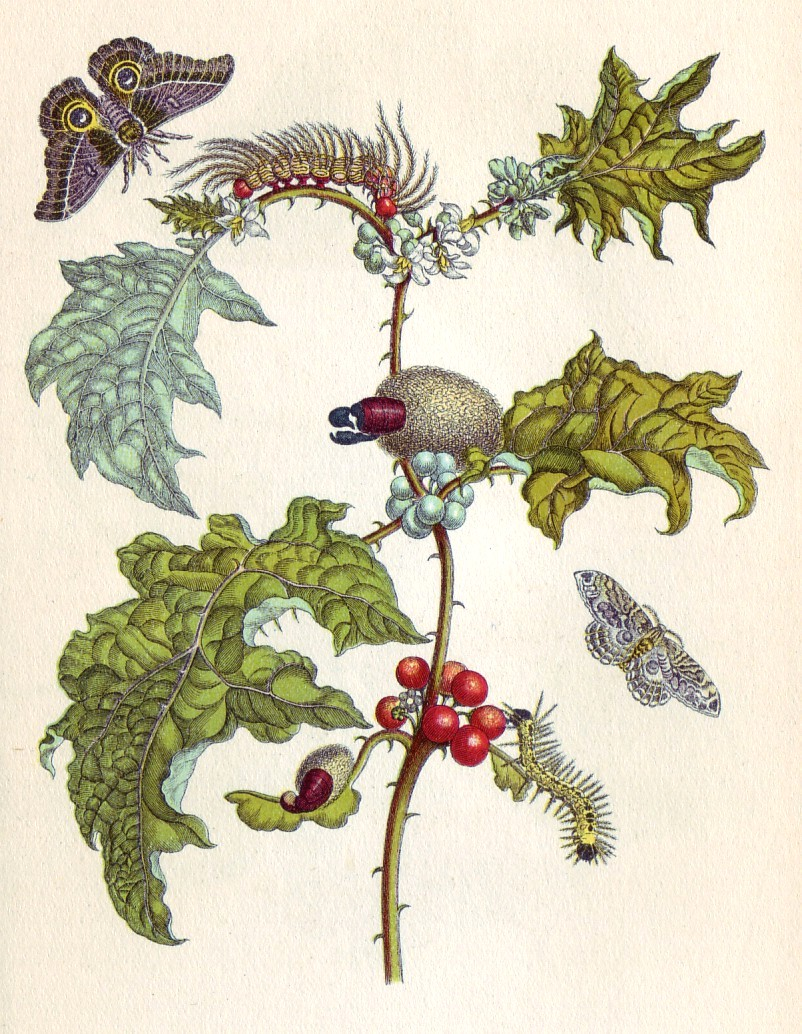

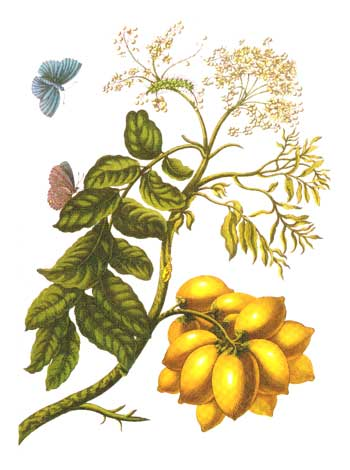

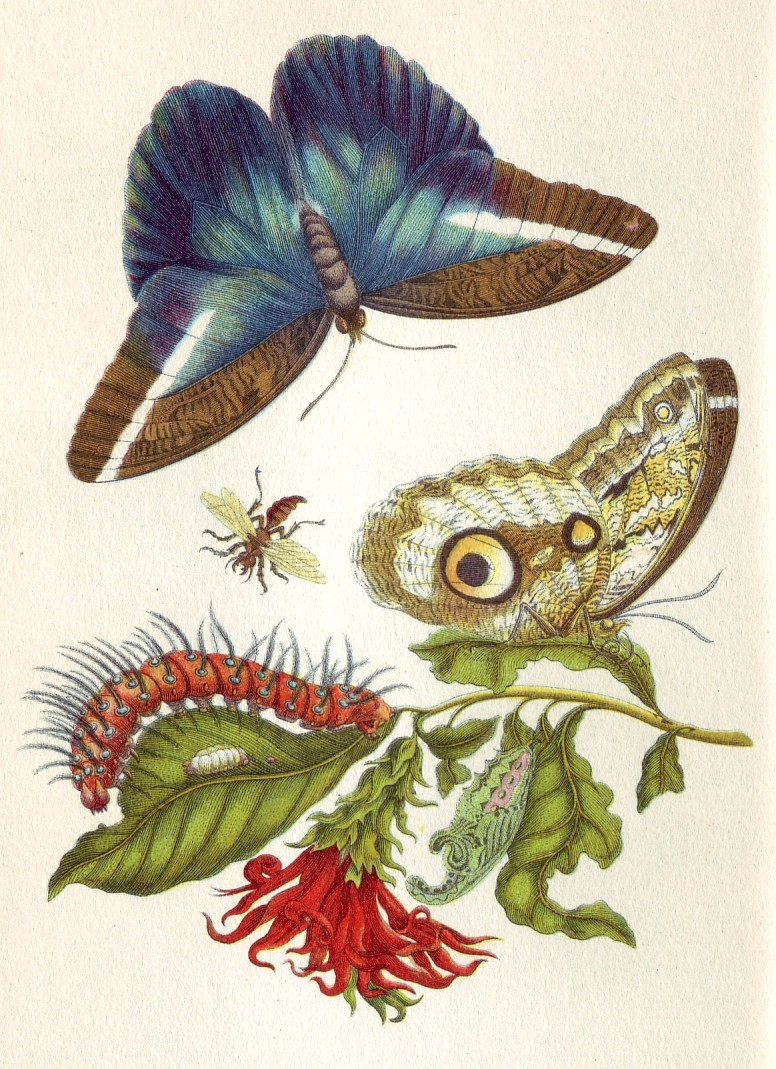

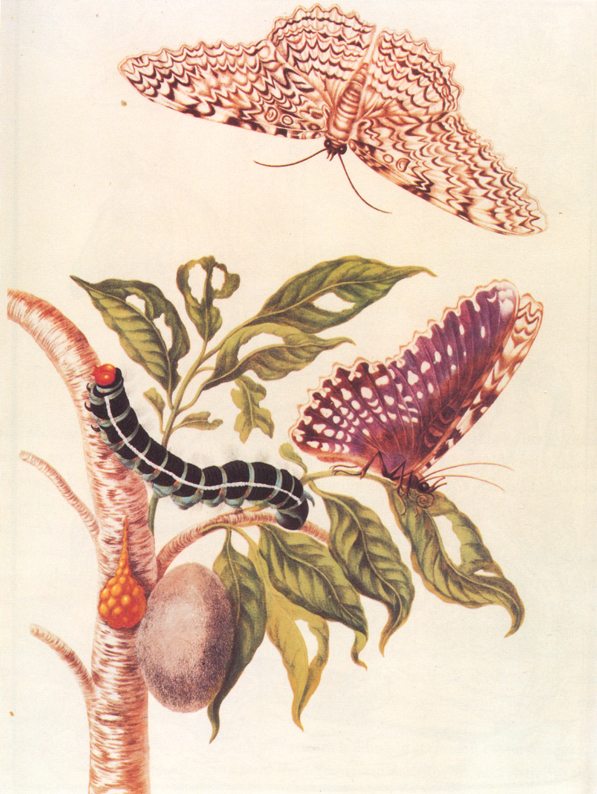

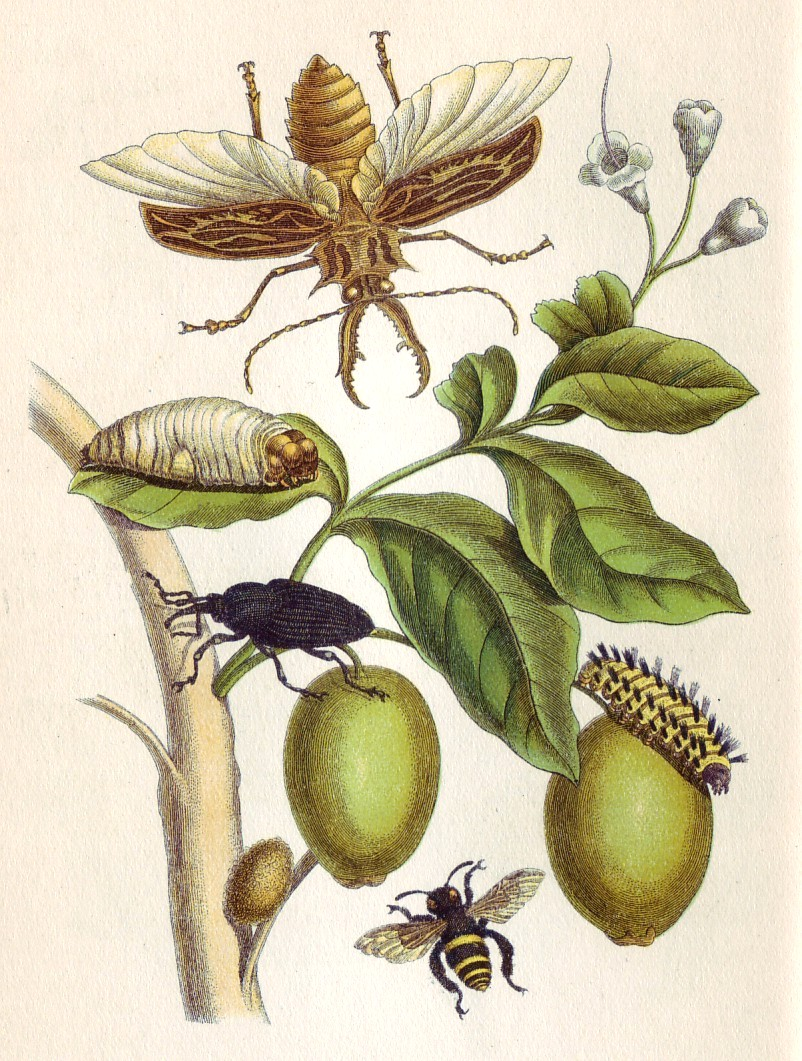

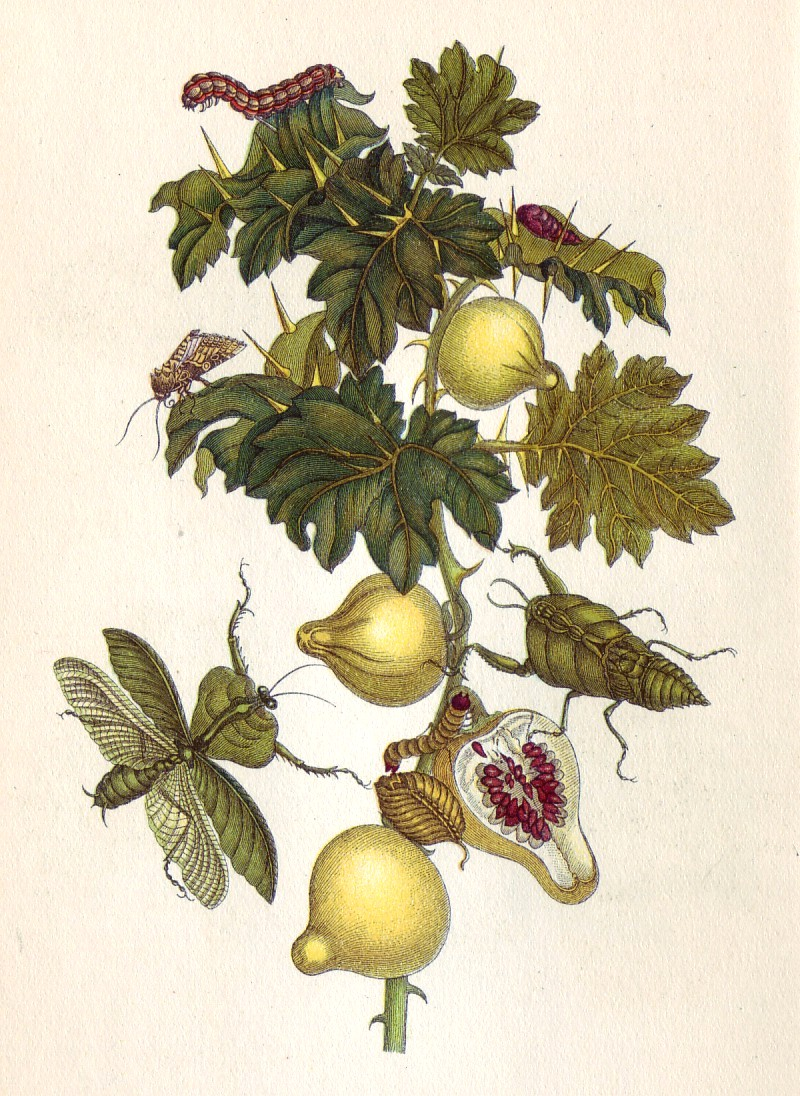

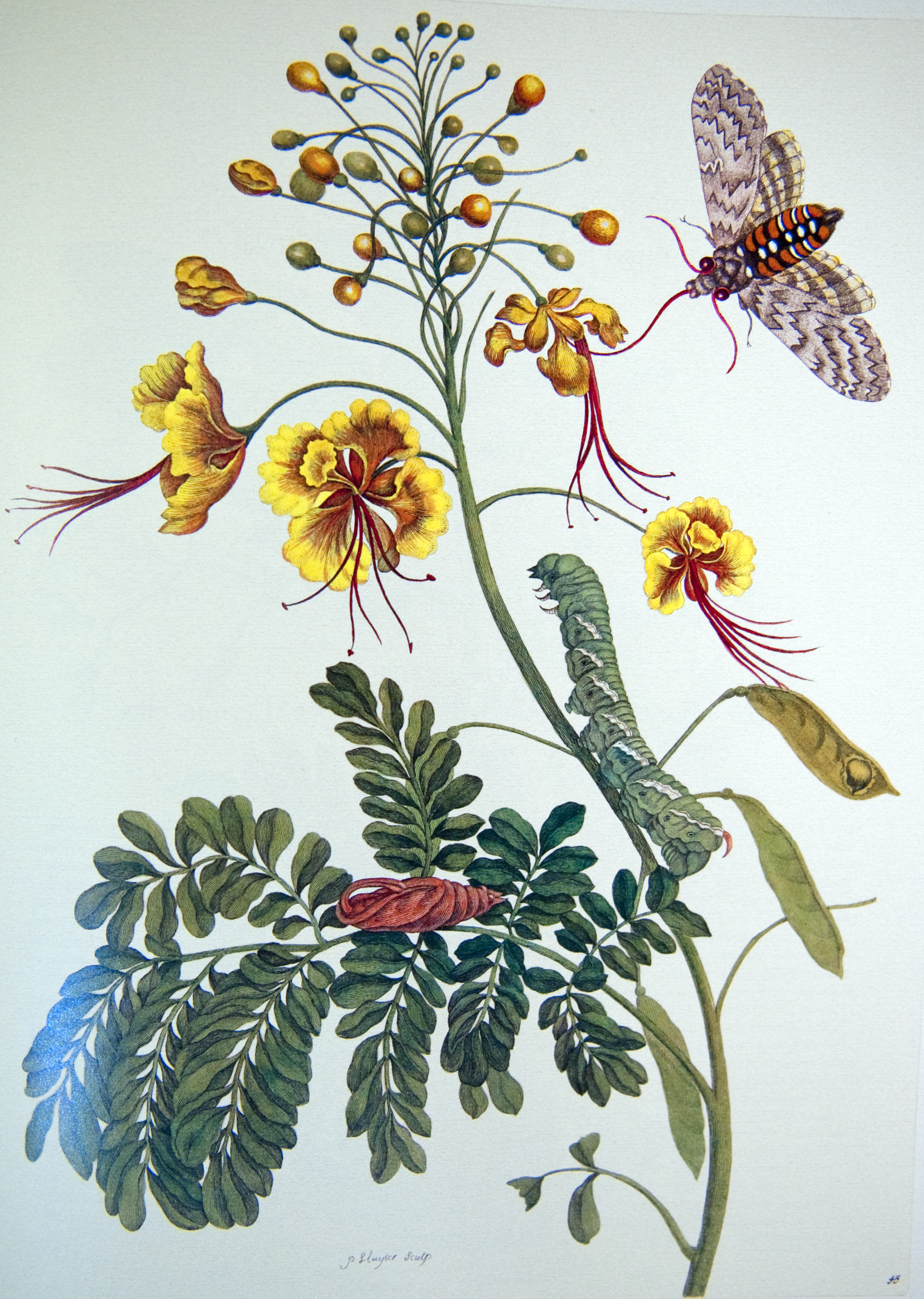

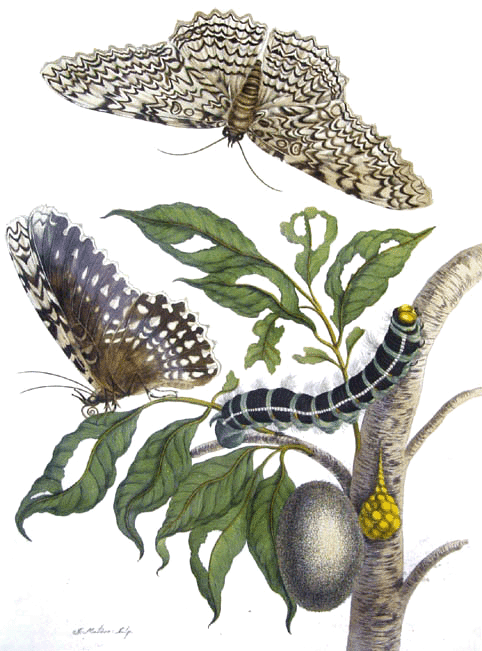

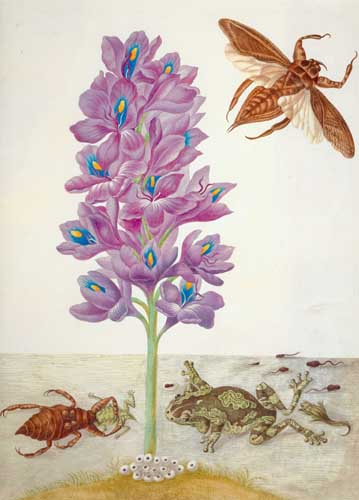

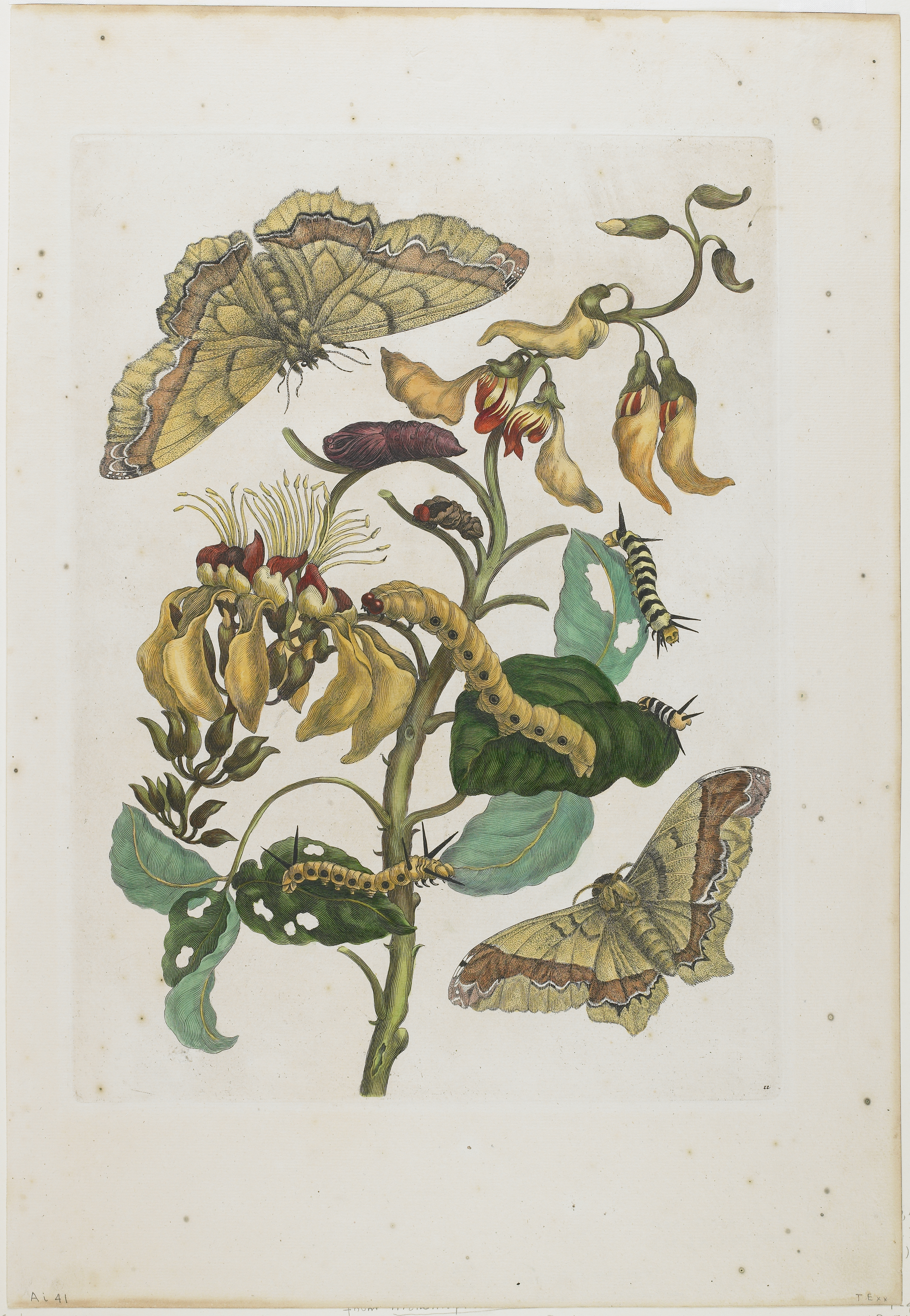

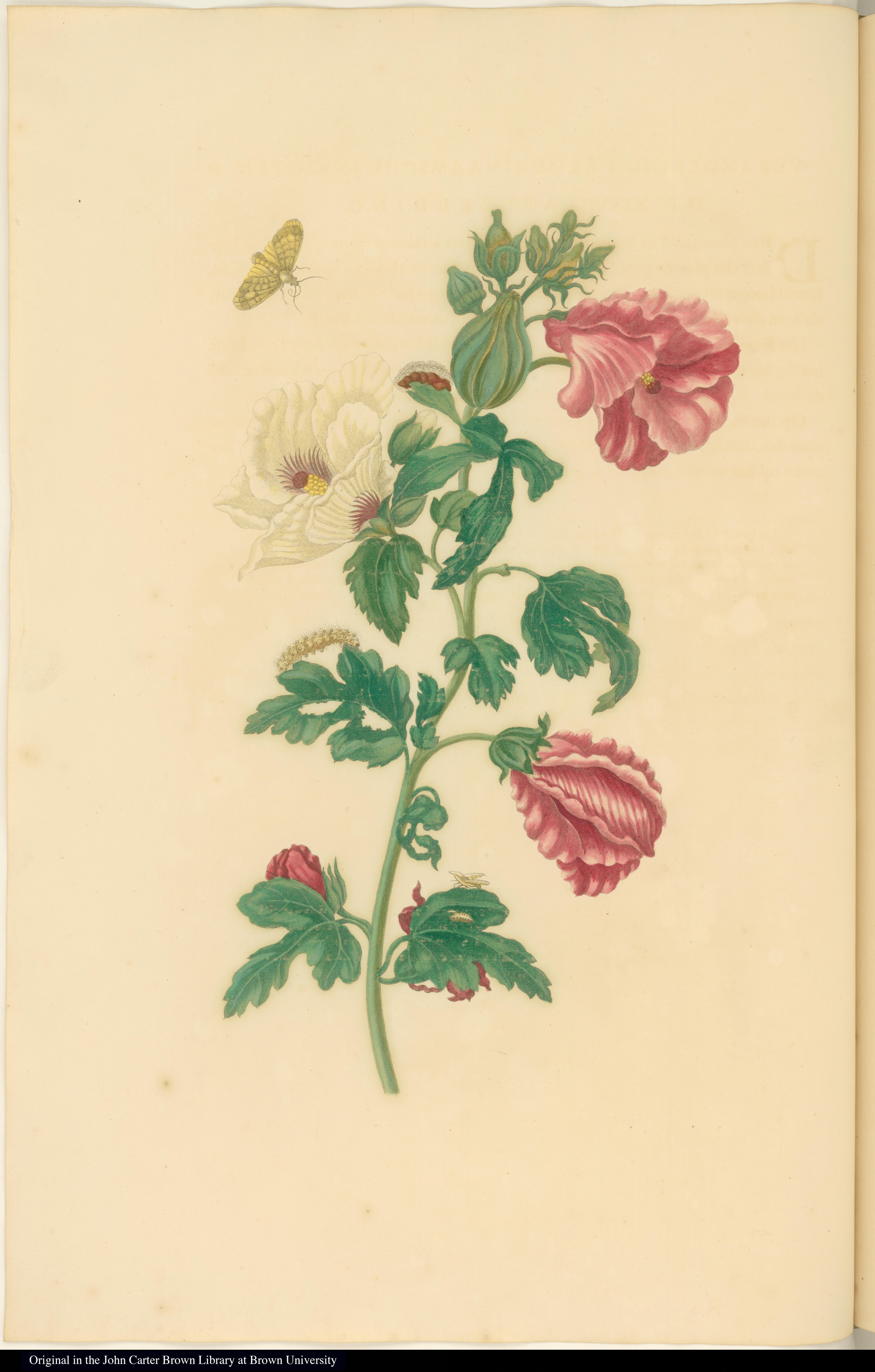
Butterfly on a hibiscus plant

== Bibliography ==
- Blumenbuch. Volume 1. 1675
- Blumenbuch. Volume 2. 1677
- Neues Blumenbuch. Volume 3. 1680
- Der Raupen wunderbare Verwandlung und sonderbare Blumennahrung. Volume 1, 1679
- Der Raupen wunderbare Verwandlung und sonderbare Blumennahrung. Volume 2, 1683
- Metamorphosis insectorum Surinamensium. 1705

== See also ==
- Timeline of women in science
- Dorothea Eliza Smith
- Anne Kingsbury Wollstonecraft
