= Dorothea Maria Graff =

Dutch artist (1678–1743)

- Born: 13 May 1678; Nuremberg, Electorate of Bavaria
- Died: 5 May 1743 (aged 64); Saint Petersburg, Russian Empire
- Spouses: Philip Hendriks (m. 1701; died 1711) Georg Gsell (m. 1715; died 1740)
- Mother: Maria Sibylla Merian

Dorothea Maria Graff (1678–1743) was an 18th-century painter born in the Duchy of Bavaria, who lived and worked in Amsterdam and Saint Petersburg.

== Biography ==
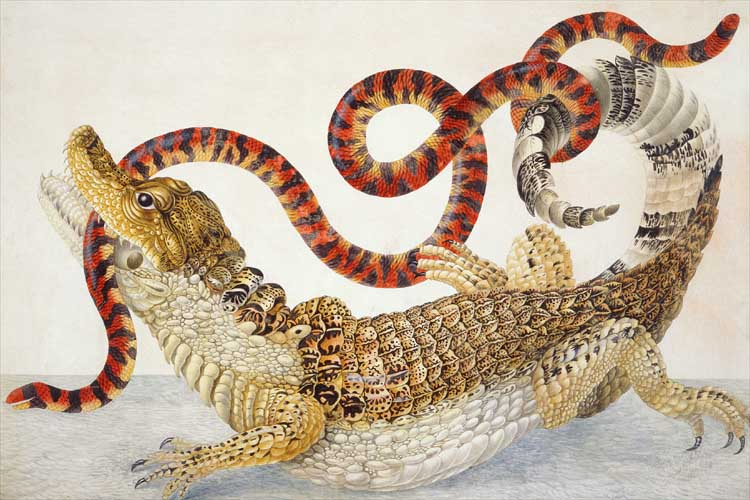
Her works are hard to tell apart from her sister's and mother's work, but Sam Segal has reattributed 30 of 91 folios in the British Museum to her

Dorothea Maria Graff was born in Nuremberg as the daughter of the painters Maria Sibylla Merian and Johann Andreas Graff, and learned to paint from them and her sister Johanna who was ten years older. In 1681 her mother returned to Frankfurt without her father, in order to live with her mother after her stepfather Jacob Marrel's death. Though Johann Graff joined his family later, in 1686 Merian left her husband and moved with her two daughters and her mother to a religious community of Labadists in Wieuwerd, Friesland. Johann Graff made various attempts at reconciliation but eventually returned to Germany. In 1691 the four women moved to Amsterdam, where they set up a studio painting flowers and botanical subjects, continuing Merian's work on "The Caterpillar Book". In 1699 Dorothea accompanied her mother to Surinam and they returned in September 1701.

She married a surgeon from Heidelberg, Philip Hendriks, a few months later on 2 December 1701. Dorothea moved in with her mother where they ran a business selling her mother's prints and paintings. The couple had a child who died young. Johanna moved with her husband to Surinam in 1711 and in the same year Dorothea's husband died and Dorothea took on her mother's name Merian, possibly for business reasons. In 1713 mother and daughter published Der rupsen begin, voedsel en wonderbaare veranderingen, followed by the second volume in 1714. Though her daughters are not mentioned by name, both Johanna and Dorothea probably contributed to the plates. In 1714 mother Maria had a stroke that partially paralysed her and Johanna returned for a visit from Surinam, painting under her mother's name and working on volume three. In 1715 Dorothea remarried, this time to the widowed Swiss painter Georg Gsell, who had recently divorced his second wife and had previously lodged with Dorothea and her mother. Gsell had been living in Amsterdam since 1704 and had five daughters from his first marriage, including Katharina, the later wife of the mathematician Leonhard Euler. From Surinam, Johanna continued to supply her sister with insects and other supplies.

In 1717, after her mother died in January, Dorothea published the third volume of her mother's Der Rupsen Begin. Works by the house of Merian were purchased by Zacharias Conrad von Uffenbach, Pieter Teyler van der Hulst, and Robert Areskin. Russian tsar Peter the Great asked the Gsell-Merian couple to come work for him, and they did, first selling all of mother Maria's work that they could. In October 1717 Georg Gsell became court painter in Saint Petersburg and Dorothea became a teacher at the Petrus Academie of Science, and curator of the natural history collection Kunstkamera (which included her own work). In 1736 she returned to Amsterdam to purchase works by her mother for the collection. She died in Saint Petersburg.
