= Johanna Helena Herolt =

German artist (1668 – after 1723)

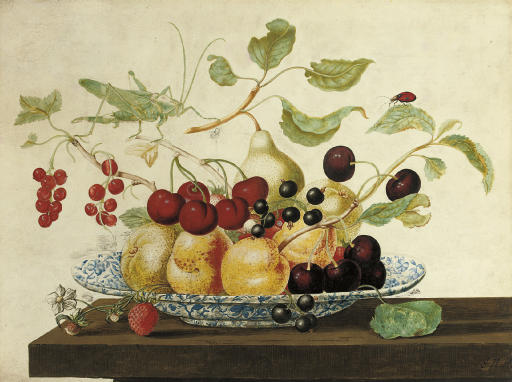
Fruit still life with insects, c. 1690

Johanna Helena Herolt (1 May 1668 – after 1723) was an 18th-century botanical artist from Germany. She was well known for her paintings, similar to her mother, Maria Sibylla Merian, with her draftsmanship.

== Biography ==
Herolt was the eldest daughter of the painters Maria Sibylla Merian, and Johann Andreas Graff, and, along with her sister Dorothea Maria Graff, learned to paint from them. Though she was born in Frankfurt, in 1670 the family moved to Nuremberg, where she was raised. In 1681 her mother returned to Frankfurt without her father, in order to live with her mother after her stepfather Jacob Marrel's death.

Though Johann Graff joined his family later, in 1686 Merian left her husband and moved with her two daughters and her mother to a religious community of Labadists in Wieuwerd, Friesland. Johann Graff made various attempts at reconciliation but eventually returned to Germany.

In 1691 the four women moved to Amsterdam, where they set up a studio painting flowers and botanical subjects, continuing Merian's work on "The Caterpillar Book". Johanna married the merchant Jacob Hendrik Herolt, also an ex-Labadist, on 28 June 1692. They had two children and Johanna began to take on her own commissions, working for Agnes Block and the Amsterdam Hortus like her mother.

Johanna moved with her husband to Surinam in 1711 where she died sometime after 1723.

== Collaborations with Merian ==
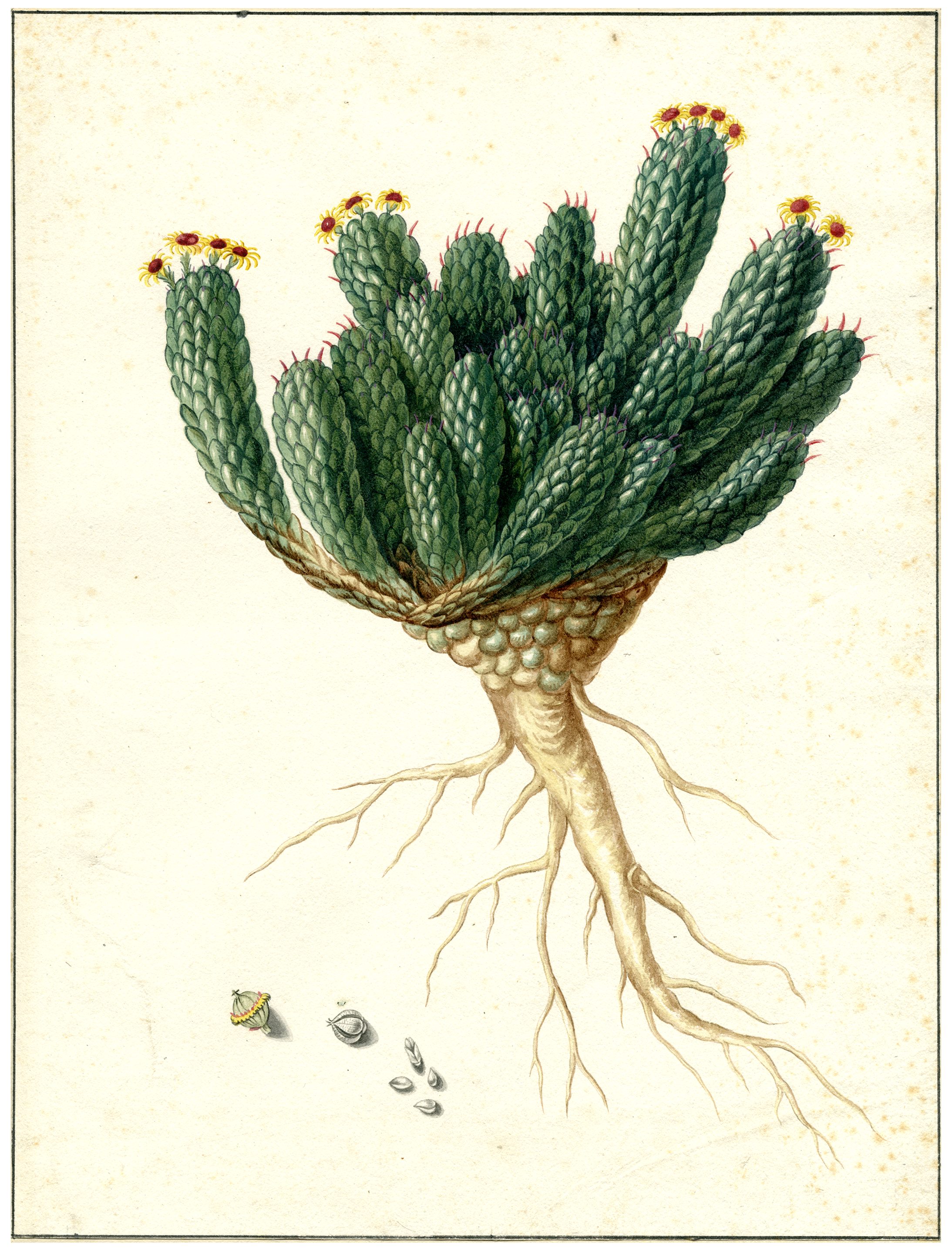
Maria Sibylla Merian or Johanna Helena Herolt, Succulent, watercolor and bodycolour.

Many works of Johanna have been mistaken for the work of her mother, Merian. In some instances, Merian and Herolt worked together, and one instance is the painting of the "Succulent." Johanna's Succulent is presented with roots intact with the body with the seeds as well.

After the flowering stage of the succulent, the seeds are formed. The blank background accentuates the purpose of the drawing which is for natural history. It gives the reader more attention to the plant than the space around it.

In the early modern period, women were inclined to draw plants and animals. Women weren't seen as suitable for historical scenes at that time. The collection in Leiden includes drawings in this genre by at least six women.

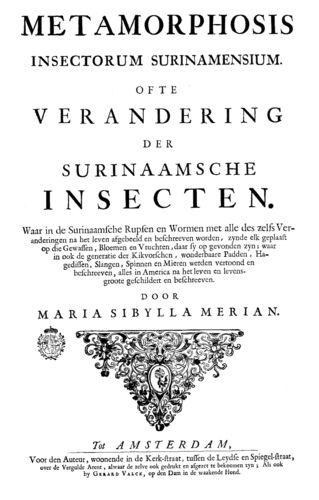
Insects of Surinam

Johanna Helena Herolt's watercolors reveal a fascination not only with flowers, but also with insect metamorphosis, as did her mother, Maria Sibylla Merian. Herolt's works are decorated with detailed depictions of the insects that accompany her plants.

Mother and daughter collaborated on numerous works, including The Insects of Suriname, which proved especially popular. Herolt had a unique talent that is often misattributed to her famous mother, but this work demonstrates Herolt's own talent.

== Botanical Art ==
A numbered series of 49 drawings signed by Herolt on vellum are in the collection of the Herzog Anton Ulrich Museum, in Brunswick. This series was possibly commissioned by the Mennonite botanist and collector Agnes Block. Other drawings by Herolt are in the British Museum.

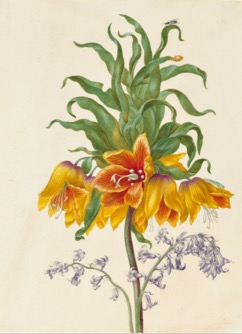
Crown Imperial

Herolt knew how to arrange plants for maximum impact. The focal point of the painting is the crown imperial, and it reveals its delicate red-veined petals with flower’s stamen and pistil. Showing the flower’s reproductive anatomy was taboo at the time, but being the daughter of Merian didn’t deter her.

Her paintings were vivid with rich colors against the vellum. The colors below the crown imperial are dull, but this detail shows the imperfections of nature. The irregular leaves also give the painting a natural feel and made it seem like it was a snapshot of real life.

In this series, Herolt depicts flies at various stages of their life cycles, such as larvae, caterpillars, and chrysalises. Nevertheless, the centerpiece of this work is the peony, which demonstrates the artist's both scientific and aesthetic skills. Herolt's diligence in depicting each plant's imperfections sets her apart from her mother. For instance, daffodil stalks are deadened and wilted, while blades curl.

As a result of Herolt's access to wild nature, her works are incredibly lifelike, and she avoids creating an idealized illusion. With precision, she recreated her specimens, including diverse colors and signs of incipient decomposition. Herolt, a true artist-scientist, contributed an appendix to Merian's Caterpillar Book on insects.

Just like her stepfather, Jacob Marrel, Johanna Helena Herolt was fascinated by tulips. During the Dutch Golden Era, Marrel worked as an artist. Even rare tulip varieties, such as Semper augustus, took two years to grow and bloom, yet just ten bulbs were worth more than a house. While tulip buds no longer sold for such vast sums in the early 18th century, Herolt found a use for them: here she arranges them with irises in an arrangement that also highlights their associated insects.

A single and double iris are depicted along with two Rembrandt tulips. Herolt incorporates stages of insect metamorphosis into her watercolors and body color paintings.

Johanna Helena Herolt produced a sheet of yellow and purple verbascum with the life-cycle of a moth. She used pictorial space confidently with its intertwining flowers stretching to fill the entire sheet. She chose a subject that is clearly related to her mother's book on moths and caterpillars, Die Raupen wunderbare Verwandlung und Sonderbare Blumennahrung. The book was published in Nürnberg and Frankfurt in 1679-83 and illustrated throughout with similar depictions of moth metamorphosis.

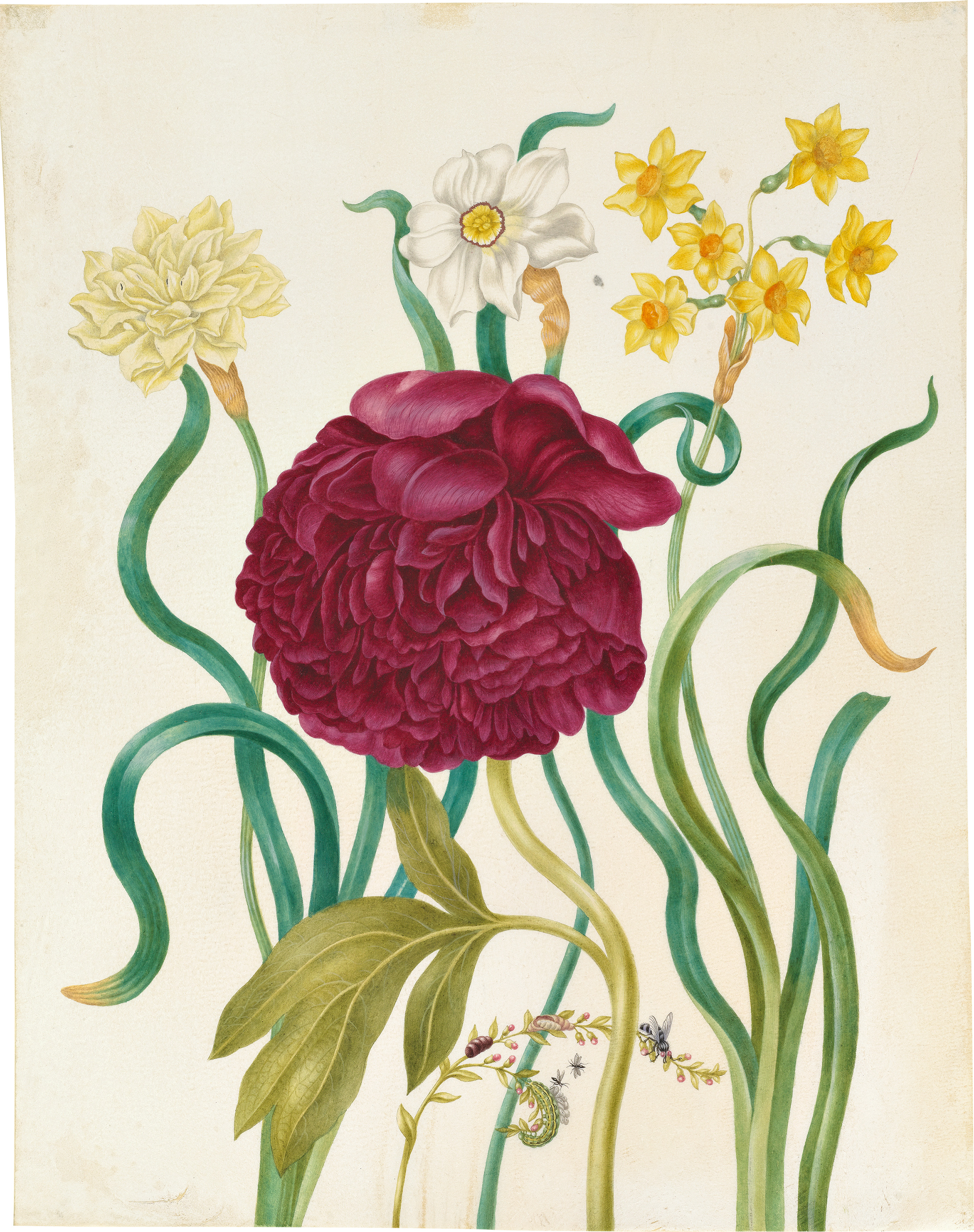
Farmer's Peony

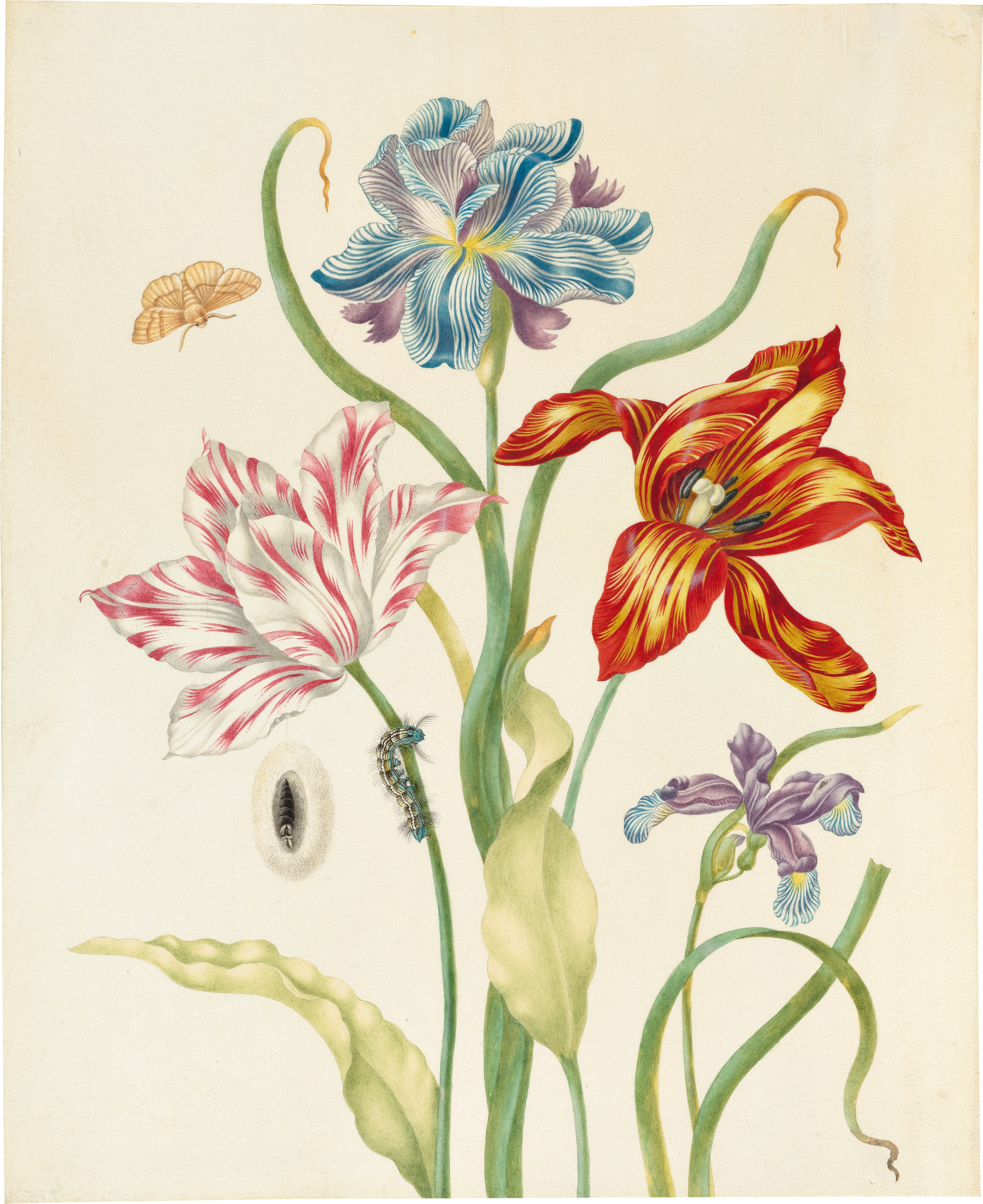
Two Tulips and Two Irises
