= Levinus Vincent =

Dutch entomologist (1658–1727)

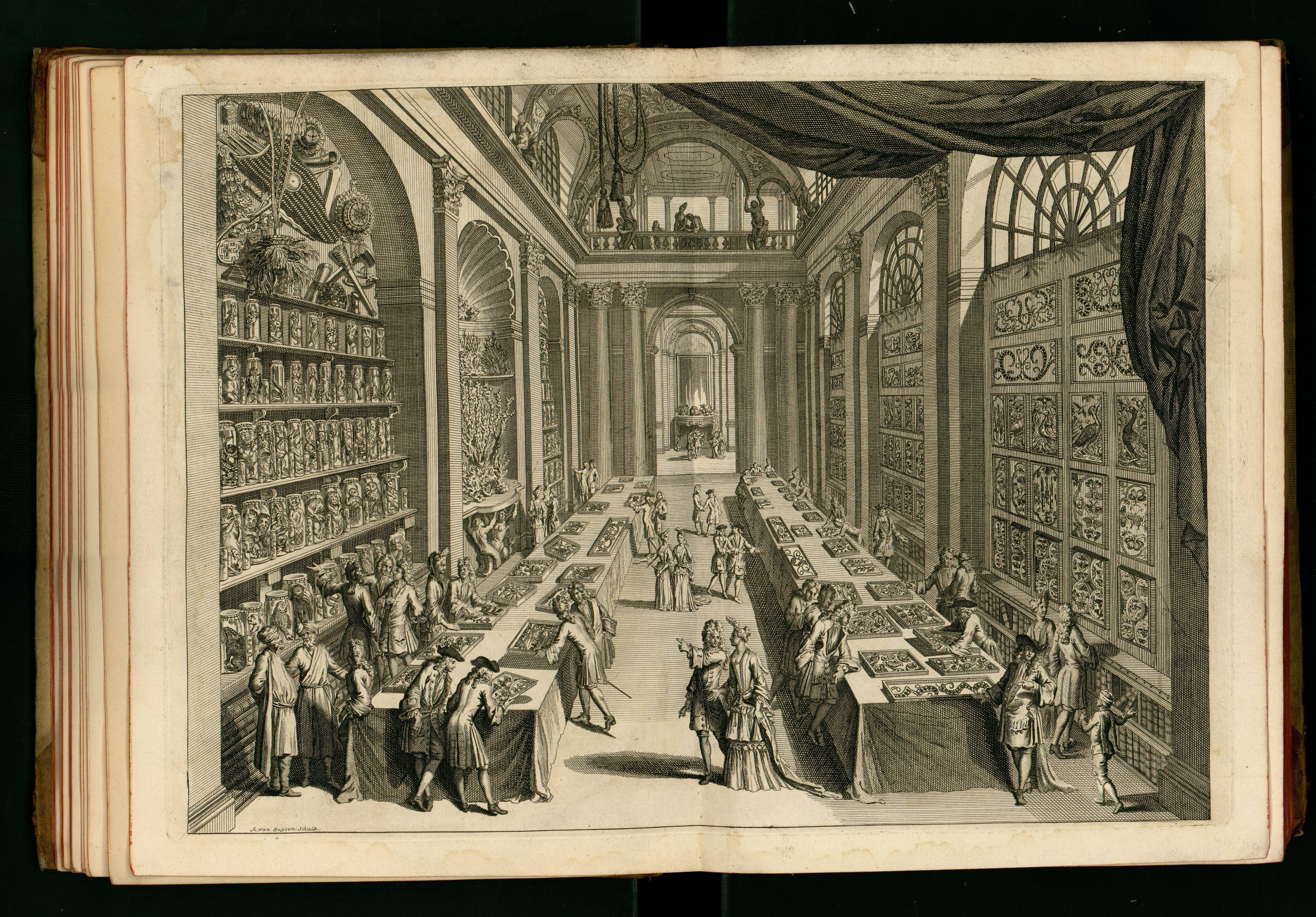
Wondertooneel der natuur Tome 1 Frontispiece

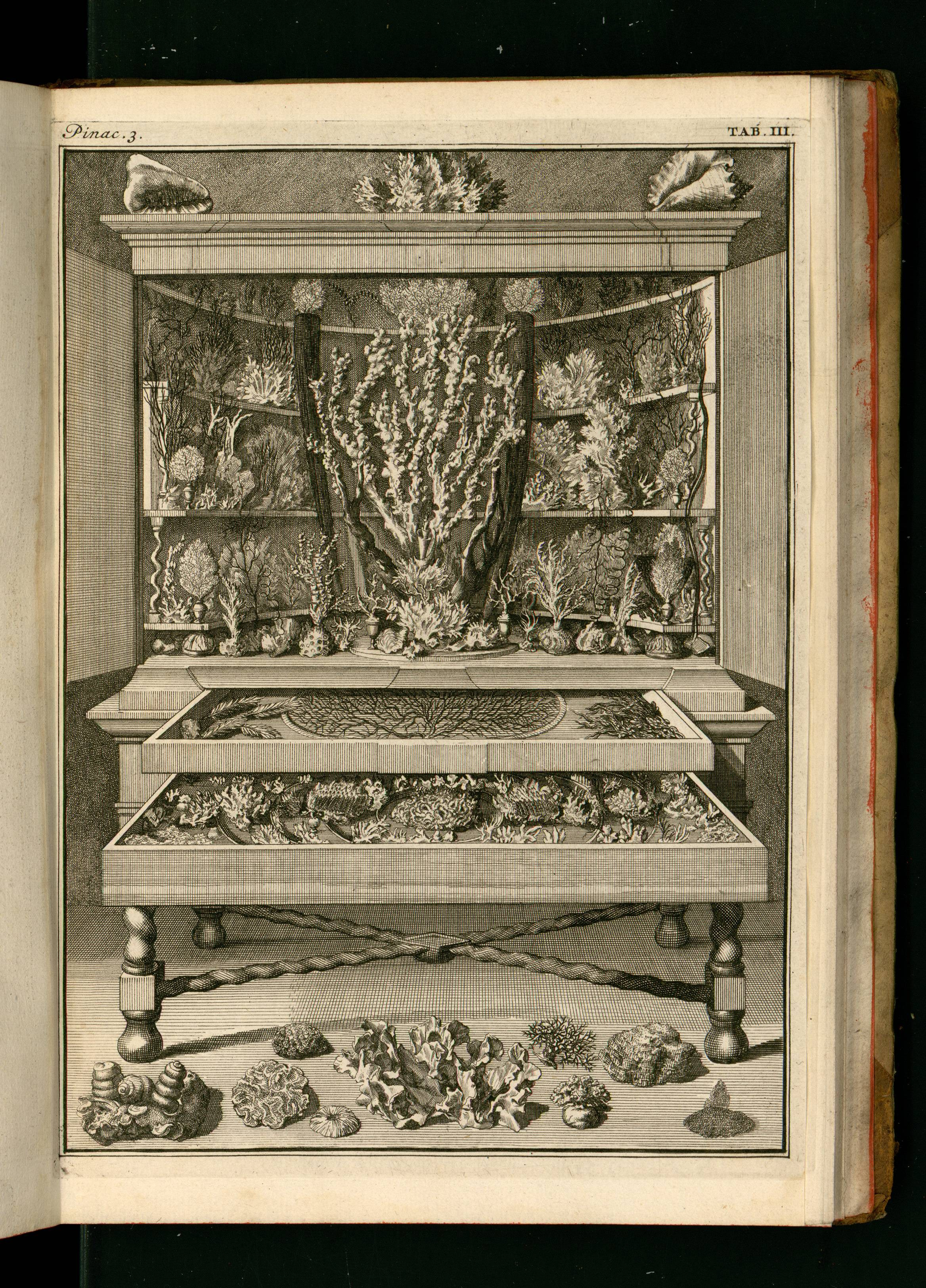
Vincent, Levinus (1715) Wondertooneel der natuur -Tome 2- 0295

Levinus Vincent the Younger (1658 in Amsterdam – 8 November 1727 in Haarlem) was a rich Dutch designer of patterns and merchant of luxurious textiles, such as damask, silk and brocade.

== Biography ==
Lieven's parents were Cornelis Joosten Heyns, a wine merchant from Harlingen and Neeltje IJsbrants from Petten, both Mennonites, who married in 1652. His mother was the widow of Vincent Pieters who lived at Rokin. (Note: Levinus had two half brothers, Levinus Vincent the Elder (1638-1688) who married Hester Riemer and Ysbrand Vincent (1641-1718) who married Anna Yver. Since 1660 they collaborated in producing and selling paper. The latter was one of the founders of Nil volentibus arduum and editor of their playwrights.) In 1657 his father was living in Sierra Leone and was involved in Danish Africa Company, together with Hendrik Carloff. The contract was signed in his (actually her) house. In 1666 he tried to save a ship named Charles after the Holmes's Bonfire. In 1668 Livinus (the Elder) and Ysbrand sold the house belonging to their mother. When Levinus married Joanna van Breda in 1683 his father was staying in the West Indies (?) and his half brother in Angoulême. Levinus lived at N.Z. Voorburgwal and from 1688 at Leliegracht (ZZ), with his wife and brother-in-law Anthony (-1693), who started the collection. In 1693 he joined the Mennonites himself.

In 1697 he was visited by Peter the Great. Levinus owned a cabinet of curiosities, collected naturalia (with shells, insects, corals, birds, lizard and small mammals as wet preparations) and artificialia - (ethnography, paintings and drawings of flowers). In 1709 he sold his house in Amsterdam accompanied by Ysbrand Vincent. In 1712 Bernard Picart married his niece Anna Vincent; the wedding was in Haarlem, where Levinus had settled around 1705. He corresponded with James Petiver and Hans Sloane. In 1715 he became a member of the Royal Society.

Vincent and his wife took a lot of effort to present their collectables in a pleasurable and instructive spectacle. They ordered their shells and insects in elegant designs that resembled magnificent pieces of embroidery. Levinus Vincent aimed at the non-Latin-speaking public, printing the catalogue of his collection in both Dutch and French - Wondertooneel der Nature (Wonder Theater of Nature), giving details of all the objects on display. This catalogue sold for three guilder plus a tip or entrance fee of two guilder. He had fixed hours for its visitors. His visitor book (from 1705 to 1737) includes at least 3,500 entries, including Charles III of Spain, François Valentijn and Albrecht von Haller.

== Sources ==
- Bert van de Roemer, Redressing the Balance: Levinus Vincent's Wonder Theatre of Nature, Public Domain Review, (https://publicdomainreview.org/2014/08/20/redressing-the-balance-levinus-vincents-wonder-theatre-of-nature/)
- Freedberg, D & J. de Vries (eds) (1991) Science, Commerce and Art. In: Art in History, History in Art, p. 379, 386.
- Vincent, L. (1715) Wondertooneel der Natuur, ofte een Korte Beschrijvinge zo van Bloedelooze, Zwemmende, Vliegende, Kruipende, en Viervoetige Geklaauwde Eijerleggende Dieren ... bevat in de Kabinetten van Levinus Vincent, adorned with a handsome title-page designed by Romeyn de Hooghe.
