= Jacob Marrel =

German Baroque painter (1614–1681)

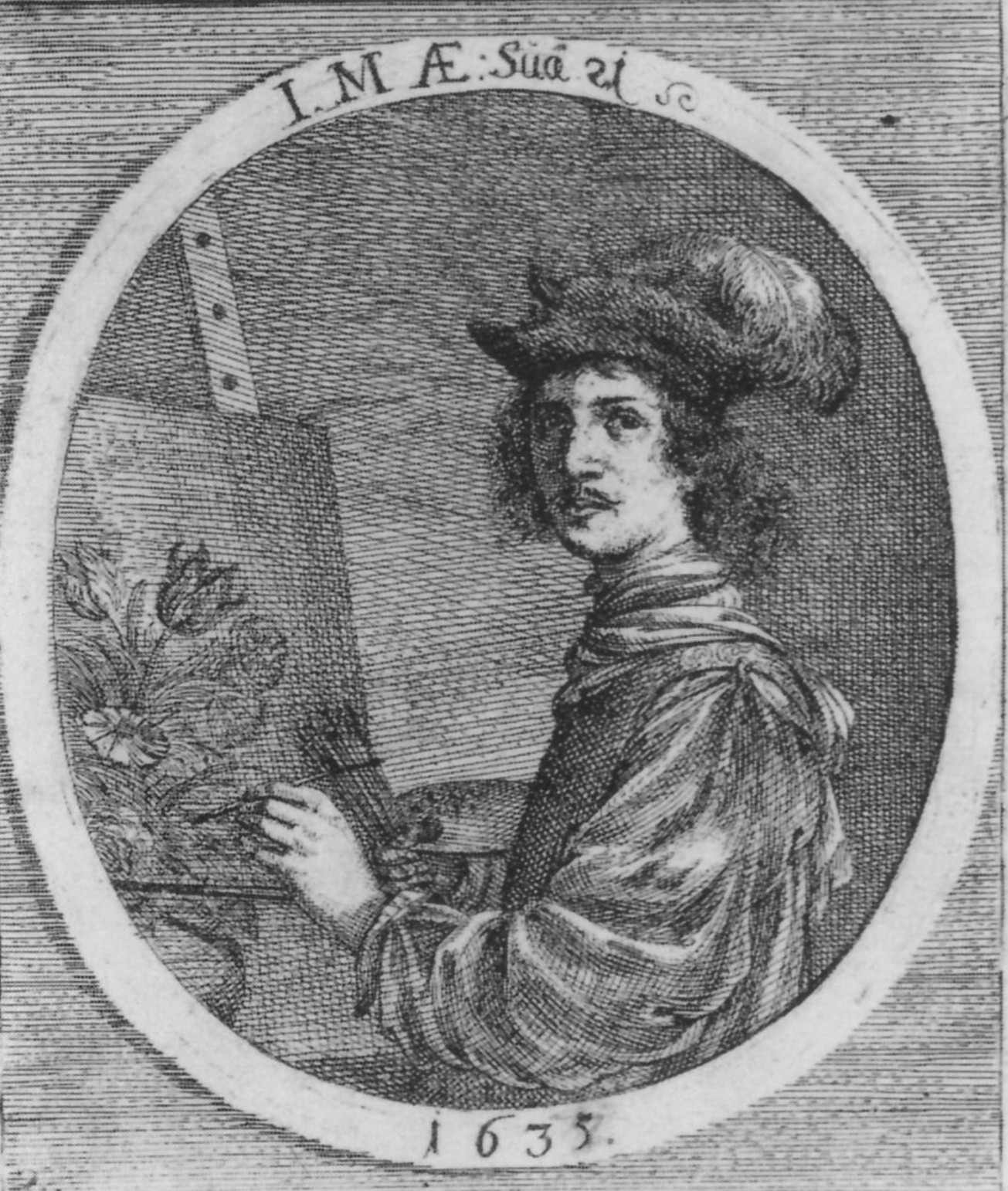
- Jacob Marrel, self-portrait 1661.
- Born: Jakob Marrel; 1614; Frankenthal, Electoral Palatinate, Holy Roman Empire
- Died: 1681 (aged 66–67); Frankfurt, Holy Roman Empire
- Known for: Painting
- Movement: Baroque

Jacob Marrel (1613/1614 – 11 November 1681) was a German still life painter active in Utrecht during the Dutch Golden Age.

== Biography ==
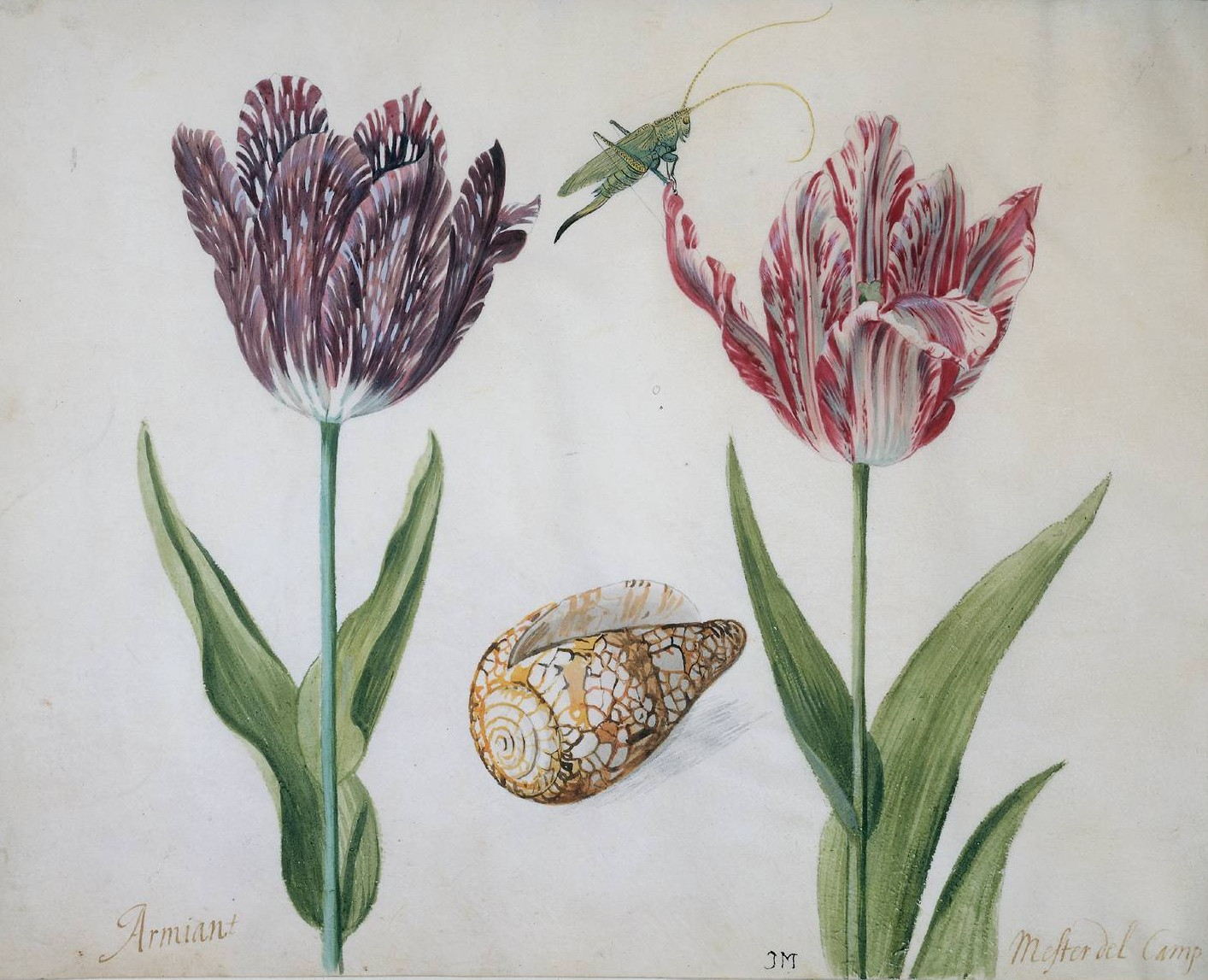
Jacob Marrel: Two tulips, a shell and an insect, 1634

Jacob Marrel was born in Frankenthal. He moved with his family in 1624 to Frankfurt, where he became a student of Georg Flegel in 1627. Attracted by the high prices for flower still life paintings, Marrel studied from 1632 to 1650 with Jan Davidszoon de Heem in Utrecht (city), before returning to Frankfurt, where he married Johanna Sybilla Heim(ius), the widow of Matthäus Merian, who died in 1650. He took on students, and his wife's daughter Maria Sibylla Merian became a renowned painter of flowers and insects, rivalling Rachel Ruysch as a female artist. She later married one of his pupils, Johann Andreas Graff, in 1665, after a 6-year tour he made to Venice and Rome upon completion of his studies under Marrel.

In 1660 Marrel spent another period in Utrecht, with his student Abraham Mignon, who married and settled there. This is presumably the period in which Maria Sibylla Merian was introduced to Dutch flower painting. In 1665 Marrel returned to Germany, attending the wedding of his step-daughter in Nuremberg and in Frankfurt establishing a school of his own in flower painting. He was active as an art dealer in Utrecht until 1669. He died in Frankfurt.

He signed his work with Jacobus Marrellus Fecit.
