= Anna van Aerssen van Sommelsdijk =

Dutch Christian (1640 – c. 1711)

- Born: 1 December 1640; The Hague
- Died: c. 1711; Wieuwerd
- Parents: Cornelis van Aerssen van Sommelsdijk (1600–1662) (father); Lucia van Walta (1610–1674) (mother)

Anna van Aerssen van Sommelsdijk (1 December 1640 – c. 1711) and her sisters are particularly known for joining Jean de Labadie and the house congregation of the Labadists in 1669, offering them housing and setting up a community in Wieuwerd in Friesland in 1675.

== Early life and family ==
Anna grew up on Lange Voorhout in The Hague as one of sixteen children of a very wealthy and strictly Reformed regent/governor family. She was the daughter of Cornelis van Aerssen van Sommelsdijk (1600–1662) and Lucia van Walta (1610–1674).

== Life ==
In 1669 Anna van Aerssen and her sisters Maria and Lucia joined the separatist house church of the recently deposed minister Jean de Labadie. According to Mirjam de Baar, they probably got to know him through their friend Anna Maria van Schurman when he was still pastor of the Walloon congregation in Middelburg. There they will have regularly visited the services led by him. In 1670 Anna van Aerssen left Amsterdam with her brothers- and sisters of faith to Herford in Germany, where Princess Elisabeth of the Palatinate (1618–1680) received the Labadists. In 1672 the group moved to Altona (then in Denmark, now a suburb of Hamburg).

== The Labadists ==
It was thanks to the Van Aerssen family that the followers of Jean de Labadie were able to settle in Wieuwerd in the summer of 1675. Via Lucia (Luts) van Walta, Anna's mother, the castle Walta – also called Thetinga-state – came into the hands of the family. After the death of Luts van Walta in June 1674, the seigniority, with all 'subordinate houses, gates, courts, canals, trees and plantations', as well as various farms, passed to son Cornelis van Aerssen van Sommelsdijk (1637–1688), who gave Walta state in return for payment of ninety thousand guilders to his three unmarried sisters. In turn, the sisters gave the Labadists the opportunity to settle in Walta state.

The Ladies Van Aerssen were related to various prominent Frisian noble families and therefore closely associated with the administrative elite of the region. This is one of the reasons why they enjoyed a privileged position within the Labadist community in Wieuwerd. Thanks to these connections, from 1675 the Labadists could count on not only the kindness of the States of Friesland, but also the sympathy of Albertine Agnes, who took over the stadtholdership for her son Hendrik Casimir II until 1677. The vicissitudes surrounding the appointment of the pastor of the congregation of Britswerd-Wiewerd illustrate the fact that the sisters indeed exercised their influence and enjoyed protection. In 1677 they used their votes to appoint a minister of their own choice, Johannes Hesener. After he was deposed in 1679, he joined the Labadists.

In 1683 and again in 1686 some of the Labadists went to Suriname, where Cornelis van Aerssen had been appointed governor, to found their own settlement there. It is unclear whether Anna van Aerssen was involved in one of these expeditions. In the floreencohier of Baarderadeel of 1700, the possessions in Wieuwerd and Britswerd are still in the name of the Ladies Van Sommelsdijk, but in that of 1708 only Anna van Sommelsdijk is mentioned as owner. Both her sisters had already died by then.

== Death ==
Anna van Aerssen herself died around 1711. According to Mirjam de Baar, she was probably buried in the Wieuwerd cemetery. After her death, her possessions passed to her sister Françoise van Sommelsdijk, dowager van Ouwerkerk. Walta state itself fell into disrepair and must have been demolished around the middle of the 18th century.

== See also ==
- Labadists
