= Euphrosine Aue =

17th/18th century German poetess

Euphrosine Aue (also Euphrosyne Aue, 3 November 1677 - 15 June 1715) was a seventeenth-century German poet who wrote in German and Latin.

== Biography ==
Euphrosine Aue was born on 3 November 1677 in Kolberg (Hinterpommern, now Kołobrzeg in Poland) to Johann Aue and Euphrosine Ursinus. Until the age of ten, Euphrosine was taught ancient Greek and Latin by her father and private tutors. For the following six years, she received private lessons in the belles lettres from David Hollatz and Johann Christoph Hösel, two teachers from the public school in Kolberg.

In 1693, Euphrosine travelled to Stargard to her uncle Gottfried Aue, who was preacher at the Augustinerkirche and deputy rector of the Collegium Groeningianum there. While Euphrosine kept his household, he taught her poetry and rhetoric, with the rector of the college, Nikolaus Benedikt Pascha, also teaching her philosophy and history. Once her uncle moved to Kolberg, Euphrosine returned to her parents, but continued to be taught by him, paying special attention to Greek and French. Her knowledge of languages was such that she spoke and wrote French, German, Greek, and Latin, and maintained learned correspondence in both Latin and French. These achievements were regarded as unusual for a woman, and made Euphrosine well-known in the local area.

In 1702, Euphrosine married the Prussian officer Carl Christoph Fritz, and, two years after his death in 1707, the merchant Martin Henneken. She gave birth to at least one child, which died in infancy, and cared for Henneken's children from his first marriage. Euphrosine died in Kolberg on 15 June 1715, and was buried on 30 June 1715.

== Works ==
Euphrosine's biographer Johann Carl Conrad Oelrichs knew 14 of her poems that had been printed, a number that is repeated by Woods and Fürstenwald. These works indicate that Euphrosine showed an affinity for poetry from an early age, for instance writing a Latin poem to mourn Elector Friedrich Wilhelm von Brandenburg when she was 11. Almost a century later, Oelrichs referred to this piece as still the best description of the elector's funeral, and it is indeed the only one of her works known to still exist.

Although her other works seem lost, Oelrich's list and other contemporary sources suggest their nature. Euphrosine composed other funerary verse, marking for example the deaths of Maria Liebeherr (1692) and Georg Wend (1695). Besides such epicedia, she also wrote panegyrics. In 1690, she presented a panegyric to the Elector Friedrich III (later Frederick I of Prussia), who is reported to have rewarded the poem and Euphrosine's accompanying speech with a gold medallion. Euphrosine's output also included epithalamia, commemorating with them the marriage of her uncle Gottfried Aue to Louisa Sophia Heiler (1698), and that of Landgrave Friedrich of Hessen to Louisa Dorothea Sophia of Brandenburg (1700). Her own death was marked by a number of publications in prose and verse which compared her to other female authors of the time, most especially to Anna Maria van Schurmann.

== Literature ==
- Johann Carl Conrad Oelrichs: Historische Nachricht vom Pommerschen gelehrten Frauenzimmer. In: Historisch-Diplomatische Beyträge zur Geschichte der Gelahrheit, besonders im Herzogthum Pommern. Verlag der Buchhandlung der Real-Schule, Berlin 1767, S. 3–7.
- Jean M. Woods, Maria Fürstenwald: Schriftstellerinnen, Künstlerinnen und gelehrte Frauen des deutschen Barock. Ein Lexikon (= Repertorien zur deutschen Literaturgeschichte Bd. 10). Metzler, Stuttgart 1984, ISBN 978-3-476-00551-9.
- Jane Stevenson: Women Latin Poets. Language, Gender, and Authority from Antiquity to the Eighteenth Century. Oxford University Press, Oxford 2005.
