= Utricia Ogle =

Dutch singer

Lady Utricia Swann-Ogle
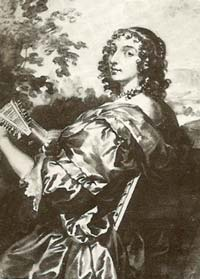
- Drawing by Jan de Bisschop after a lost painting by Caspar Netscher
- Baptised: 10 February 1611; Utrecht
- Died: 1674 (62–63); Hamburg
- Family: Ogle family
- Spouse: Sir William Swann (m. 1645)
- Father: Sir John Ogle
- Occupation: Singer; Muse

Utricia Ogle, Lady Swann (née Ogle; bapt. 10 February 1611 – 1674) was an Anglo-Dutch singer who moved in the entourage of the Stuarts in The Hague, and was known as the 'muse' of Constantijn Huygens.

== Life ==
=== Origins ===
Utricia Ogle was a daughter of the 'one-eyed Englishman named ridder John Ogley', who had distinguished himself in 1600 at the Battle of Nieuwpoort and had been promoted to colonel in the State service in 1605. Her mother, Elisabeth de Vries (died 1656), was a mayor's daughter from Dordrecht. She grew up in a child-rich family. Utricia's curious first name was directly related to her father's career. After joining the Utrecht legislature of 1610, John Ogle was appointed governor of the city by Prince Maurits. When he invited the Council of Utrecht in 1611 to the baptism of his daughter, born in Utrecht, he also asked them to choose a name for her. Thus, she was baptised 'Utricia' in the Utrecht Cathedral in February in the presence of a member of the Ridderschap. She also received a benefit because of this collegial connection. When her father sent her to England in 1625, it passed to her younger sister Trajectina (not named after the region, like Utricia, but after the city of Utrecht).

=== Singer and muse ===
From 1625 to 1642 Utricia Ogle stayed in England. In those years she must also have lived in Paris for some time, because according to Constantijn Huygens she had music lessons there from the harpsichordist Jacques Champion de Chambonnières. (Note: Driehonderd brieven, 763–768.) She returned to Holland in early 1642, presumably in the retinue of Princess Maria Henrietta Stuart, who had just married William II. In The Hague, Ogle impressed with her singing. Among others, Elizabeth Stuart was among her audience when she performed at Huygens' home. It is unclear whether Utricia Ogle was part of the Stuart household, but she and her future husband Sir William Swann were certainly part of their artistic entourage: Elizabeth Stuart called her 'my fiddler' in 1654. (Note: Briefwisseling 5, 215–216.)

The network of art friendships that Utricia and Trajectina Ogle maintained in the Netherlands is sometimes difficult to untangle, as both are referred to as 'Miss Ogle'. Maria Tesselschade, friends with Huygens and Francina Duarte, was a key figure in this group. Constantijn Huygens, a widower since 1637, met Utricia Ogle in 1642. He was deeply impressed by her. As an example of the many lines of verse he devoted to her in these years, in which the puns tumble over each other, a fragment from a poem he wrote in August 1642: In 't einde zeg ik: Ogeltje, / Gij toverende vogeltje ('In the end I say: Ogeltje, / Thou enchanting little bird'). (Note: Gedichten 3, 211–212)

=== Marriage ===
Utricia Ogle married the soldier William Swann (died 1678) on 18 December 1645 in the English church of Utrecht. Nevertheless, the friendship with Huygens lasted. She and Swann, who also played music, liked to perform Huygens' compositions, and in 1647 Huygens dedicated his Pathodia sacra et profana to Utricia Ogle. When the collection came out, the couple was in the middle of a move, so their free copy was sent to Ogle's friend Anna Maria van Schurman, who wrote him a thank-you letter in Latin on her behalf. It can be concluded from the correspondence that Huygens and Ogle made music together. In the letter of 1647, Van Schurman recalls that he had performed pieces from the collection with 'our Siren', (Note: Driehonderd brieven, 848–850.) in 1649 Van Schurman praised 'Madame Zwaen' for her expertise at the court in The Hague, and in 1650 Huygens asked Van Schurman to organise a singing evening for himself, her brother, neighbour Voetius, and the couple Swann-Ogle. This was cancelled due to the sudden death of Prince William II. When Van Schurman lived in Cologne, Ogle visited her there. Van Schurman then wrote: Hier laat een edele Zwaan haar blijde stemme horen: / een stem van grote kunst, een stem van groot geweld ('Here a noble Swan makes her joyful voice heard: / A voice of great art, a voice of great violence').

Ogle's marriage to Swann, as far as is known, remained childless. From 1648 her husband often stayed abroad, partly on diplomatic missions for the Stuarts. Utricia Ogle initially stayed in the Republic, where she stayed with the English noblewoman Lady Stanhope at Teilingen Castle. Huygens also occasionally contacted her there, usually about musical subjects.

=== Death ===
In 1674 Utricia Ogle died in Hamburg, where Swann had been established as permanent chargé d'affaires since 1661. In her will of 1668, she named her nephew and godson Utricia Avery as sole heir.

== Reputation ==
In the history of Dutch music and literature, Utricia Ogle lives on above all as the unattainable 'muse' of Constantijn Huygens. In addition to her beautiful voice, her beauty is a permanent topos in his oeuvre. In 1644, Huygens and the Haarlem composer J. A. Ban published Latin poems in quick succession about a portrait of Ogle, presumably by the Anglo-Dutch painter Anthony van Dyck. The whereabouts of this portrait is unknown. It is now certain that the drawing in Turin, which has always been published as a portrait of Utricia, cannot represent her.
