= John Ogle =

English military commander

Sir John Ogle
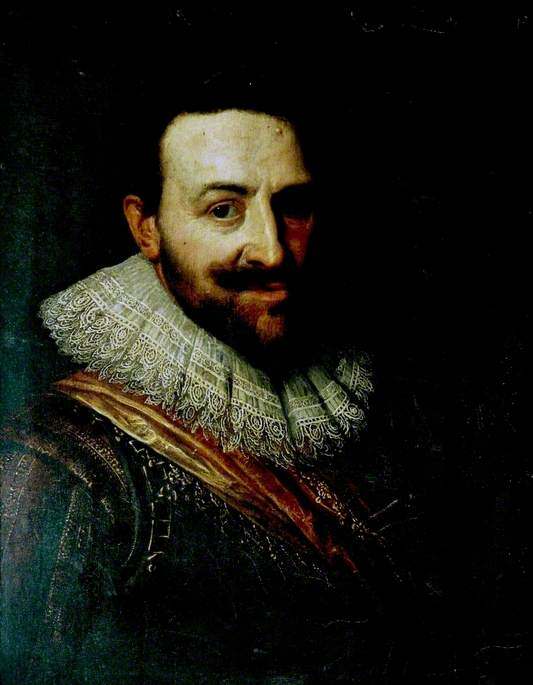
- Portrait of Sir John Ogle
- Born: 1569
- Died: 1640 (aged 70–71)
- Burial place: Westminster Abbey
- Spouse: Elizabeth de Vries (m.)
- Children: 11 (4 sons, 7 daughters)
- Military career
- Allegiance: Kingdom of England
- Branch: English Army
- Rank: Captain
- Conflicts: Eighty Years War; Anglo-Spanish War

Sir John Ogle (1569–1640) was an English military commander.

== Life ==
=== Origins ===
John Ogle was the fifth son of Thomas Ogle of Pinchbeck, Lincolnshire (died 3 May 1574) by Jane (died 2 September 1574), daughter of Adlard Welby of Gedney, Lincolnshire. The eldest son, Sir Richard Ogle, knighted on 23 April 1603, was sheriff of Lincolnshire in 1608, and died insolvent in the Fleet in 1627. His portrait is at Ayscoughfee Hall. Born at Pinchbeck, John was baptised there on 28 February 1568–9.

=== The Low Countries ===
Devoting himself to the profession of arms, he became in 1591 sergeant-major-general under Sir Francis Vere in the Low Countries, and remained on active service there for nearly thirty years. On 2 July 1600 he took part, as lieutenant-colonel under Sir Francis Vere, in the great Battle of Nieuport. In the retreat of the English at the opening of the engagement, he helped to rescue Vere, who had been wounded. Afterwards he rallied the English force, and, renewing the fight, finally drove the enemy back. Ogle was also with Vere while the latter was besieged in Ostend. In December 1601, when Vere desired negotiations with the Spanish besiegers, Ogle was sent to the camp of the Archduke as hostage for the safety of the Spanish envoys who were sent to Vere's quarters. William Dillingham included in his Commentaries of Sir Francis Vere (1657) Ogle's accounts of the last charge at the battle of Nieuport, and of the parley at Ostend.

During a brief stay in England in 1603, Ogle was knighted at Woodstock (10 December), but he soon returned to the Low Countries, and actively helped to recover Sluis from the Spaniards in April 1604. With the other English colonels, Sir Horace Vere and Sir Edward Cecil, Ogle had frequent differences of opinion; but his energy and politic temper were fully recognised by the States-General and the stadtholder, Prince Maurice, who in 1610 nominated him to the responsible office of governor of Utrecht. That city was at the time showing those first signs of discontent with the policy of Prince Maurice and the States-General which led, a few years later, to serious internal commotion throughout the Dutch provinces. And one of Ogle s earliest duties was to suppress a conspiracy which had for its object the seizure of himself and the overpowering of his garrison. When Barneveldt, the leader of the party opposed to Prince Maurice, gained a position of influence in Utrecht, Ogle hesitated to take any strong measures against him, because he had been a friend and admirer of Ogle's former chief, Sir Francis Vere. But in 1618, when urged by Barneveldt's supporters to place his soldiers at their disposal, he deliberately refused. His attitude had not, however, been sufficiently decisive, in the earlier stages of the movement, to warrant his continuance in his office, and before the year closed he was succeeded as governor by Sir Horace Vere. (Note: cf. Motley, Life of Barneveldt, i. 164, ii. 230-1; Wagenaar, Vad. Hist. x. 31, 220-94.) Shortly afterwards he finally left the Low Countries.

=== England ===
In consideration of his services abroad, James I made Ogle a grant of arms on 11 January 1614–15. While in Holland he had not wholly neglected affairs at home, and was one of the most enthusiastic members of the Virginia Company. His name appears as one of the promoters in both the second (23 May 1609) and third (March 1612) charters of the company. On his return to England he was readmitted a member, and he joined the council in 1623. In the same year Henry West, 4th Baron de la Warr, transferred to him three shares in the company. (Note: Brown, Genesis, pp. 212, 544.) In April 1624 Ogle was appointed by James I member of a new and important council of war, which represented all the available military knowledge of the day. The immediate business of the council was to consider England's intervention in the Thirty Years' War, but Ogle was largely occupied in surveying the fortifications on the sea-coast. In 1625 he was present at James I's funeral. (Note: Nichols, Progresses, iii. 1043.) Shortly afterwards he undertook, with other speculators, the task of draining the level of Hatfield Chace in Yorkshire. The venture proved unremunerative, and dwellers in the neighbourhood petitioned the council of York in 1634 for the arrest of Ogle and his partners, owing to their failure to complete the operations. At the same time, "with a purpose rather to mend his fortunes than to require his attendance", Ogle received, with the approval of Lord Deputy Wentworth, a captain's commission in the army employed in Ireland. (Note: Strafford Papers, i. 107.) But when he claimed pay, amounting in May 1638 to 1,464l. 11s., for merely nominal services, Wentworth declined to recognise the demand, despite the favour extended by the king to Ogle's petition. (Note: Strafford Papers, ii. 201; Cal. State Papers, 1637-8, p. 427.)

=== Legacy ===
Ogle was buried in Westminster Abbey on 17 March 1639–40. (Note: Chester, Reg. Westminster Abbey, p. 134.) His burial in the abbey is also noted in the parish register of St. Peter-le-Poer, London. His will, dated 6 December 1628, was proved on 15 July 1640. (Note: P. C. C. 105, Coventry.) His widow, Elizabeth, daughter of Cornelius de Vries of Dordrecht, was the executrix. On 11 May 1622 a grant of denization was made to Lady Elizabeth, Ogle's wife, and to John, Thomas, Cornelius, and Dorothy, his children, all of whom were born in the Low Countries. (Note: Cal. 1619-23, p. 390.) Among the archives of the House of Lords is a draft bill (dated 1626) for naturalising Ogle's wife, four sons, and seven daughters; (Note: Hist. MSS. Comm. 4th Rep. p. 122.) this bill did not become law.

An engraved portrait by William Faithorne appears in Dillingham's Commentaries of Vere (1657), (Note: W. Dillingham, Commentaries of Vere 1657, p. 106.) and is reproduced in Brown's Genesis of the United States (1891). (Note: Brown, Genesis of the United States, ii. 691.) A black patch covers the left eye. The eldest son, Sir John Ogle of Pinchbeck, was knighted at Oxford on 2 February 1645–6; and, dying unmarried on 26 March 1663, was buried in St. John the Baptist Chapel of Westminster Abbey. (Note: Chester, p. 168.) A second son, Thomas (died 1702), was knighted in 1660, and became governor of Chelsea Hospital in 1696. Of Ogle's seven daughters, Livina was wife of Sir John Manwood, the judge. The names of three other daughters – Utricia or Eutretia (1600–1642), Trajectina, and Henerica – commemorated his connection with the Low Countries.

== Sources ==
- Pedigree by Mr. Everard Green, FSA, in Genealogist, i. 321;
- Gardiner's History;
- Calendar of State Papers, 1690–1640;
- Markham's Fighting Veres, passim;
- Van der Aa's Biographisch Woordenboek der Nederlander, xiv. 58.

== See also ==
- Ogle family
- Utricia Ogle
