= Wiuwert =

Wieuwerd Wiuwert
- Village
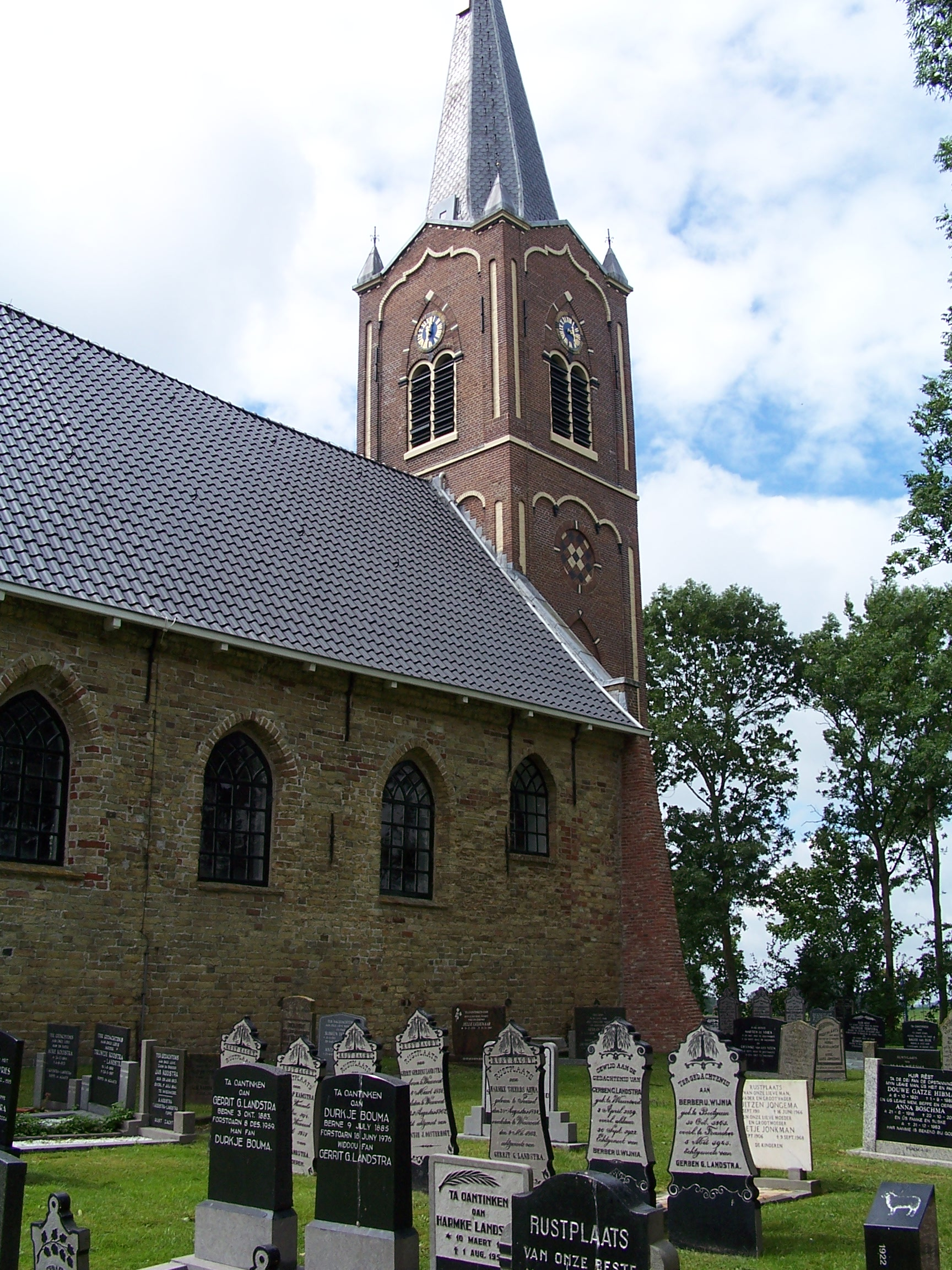
- Wieuwerd church

- Flag Coat of arms

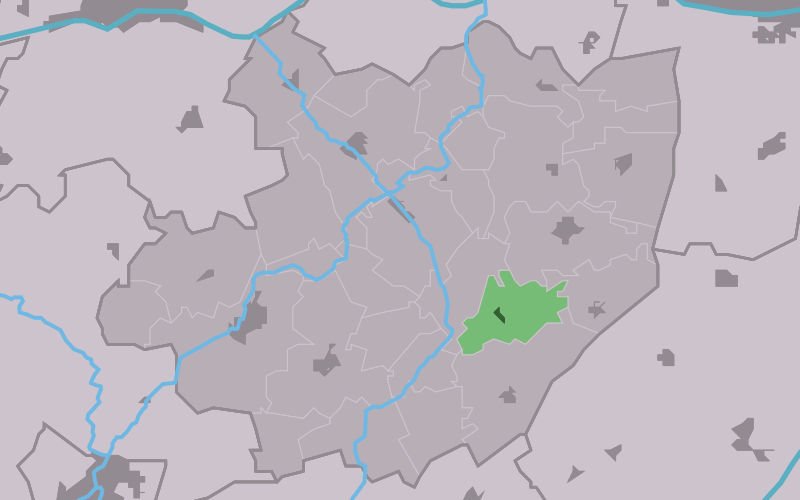
- Location in the former Littenseradiel municipality

- Location in the Netherlands Wieuwerd (Netherlands)
- Country: Netherlands
- Province: Friesland
- Municipality: Súdwest-Fryslân

Area
  - Total: 4.08 km^{2} (1.58 sq mi)
- Elevation: 0.2 m (0.66 ft)

Population (2021)
  - Total: 290
  - Density: 71/km^{2} (180/sq mi)
- Time zone: UTC+1 (CET)
  - Summer (DST): UTC+2 (CEST)
- Postal code: 8637
- Dialing code: 058

Wiuwert (Dutch: Wieuwerd) is a village in Súdwest-Fryslân municipality in the province of Friesland, the Netherlands. It had a population of around 277 in January 2017. Wiuwert is known for the Labadist community and the natural mummification in the basement of the church.

== History ==
The village was first mentioned in the 13th century as Wiwerth. The etymology is unclear. Wiuwert is a terp (artificial living hill) village. Before the poldering of the lakes and when Wiuwert was located along the former Middelzee, it was a thriving fishing village which was described to have contained more than 180 houses.

The Dutch Reformed church dates from around 1200, but has been modified several times, the latest being between 1860 and 1870. The tower dates from 1888. The basement of the church contains mummies and natural mummification occurs if a body is placed in the basement.

Wiuwert was home to 83 people in 1840. In 1866, part of the terp was excavated and a hoard of 39 golden objects was discovered, including one of the tremisses of Audulf of Frisia. The coins in the collection prove that it was buried around 640.

Before 2018, the village was part of the Littenseradiel municipality and before 1984 it belonged to Baarderadeel municipality.

== Labadist community ==
After the death of the pietist Jean de Labadie in 1674, his followers set up a community in Wieuwerd at the stately Walt(h)a Castle that belonged to three of them, the sisters Van Aerssen van Sommelsdijck. Here, the Labadists engaged in printing and many other occupations, including farming and milling. The original settlers included the famed poet, painter and scholar Anna van Schurman, who died in Wieuwerd in 1678. One member, Hendrik van Deventer, skilled in chemistry and medicine, set up a laboratory at the house and treated many people, including Christian V, the King of Denmark. Several other noted visitors have left their accounts of visits to the Labadist community. One was Sophie of Hanover, mother of King George I of Great Britain; another was William Penn, the Quaker pioneer, who gave his name to the US state of Pennsylvania; a third was the English philosopher John Locke. Between 1685 and 1691, the naturalist and scientific illustrator Maria Sibylla Merian stayed at the community in Wieuwerd with her daughters Johanna Helena and Dorothea Maria. Merian's husband was refused by the Labadists, but came back twice.

Several Reformed pastors left their parishes to live in community at Wieuwerd. At its peak, the community numbered around 600 with many more adherents further afield. Visitors came from England, Italy, Poland and elsewhere, though not all approved of the strict discipline, separatism and community property. The community lasted until 1730.

== Mummies ==
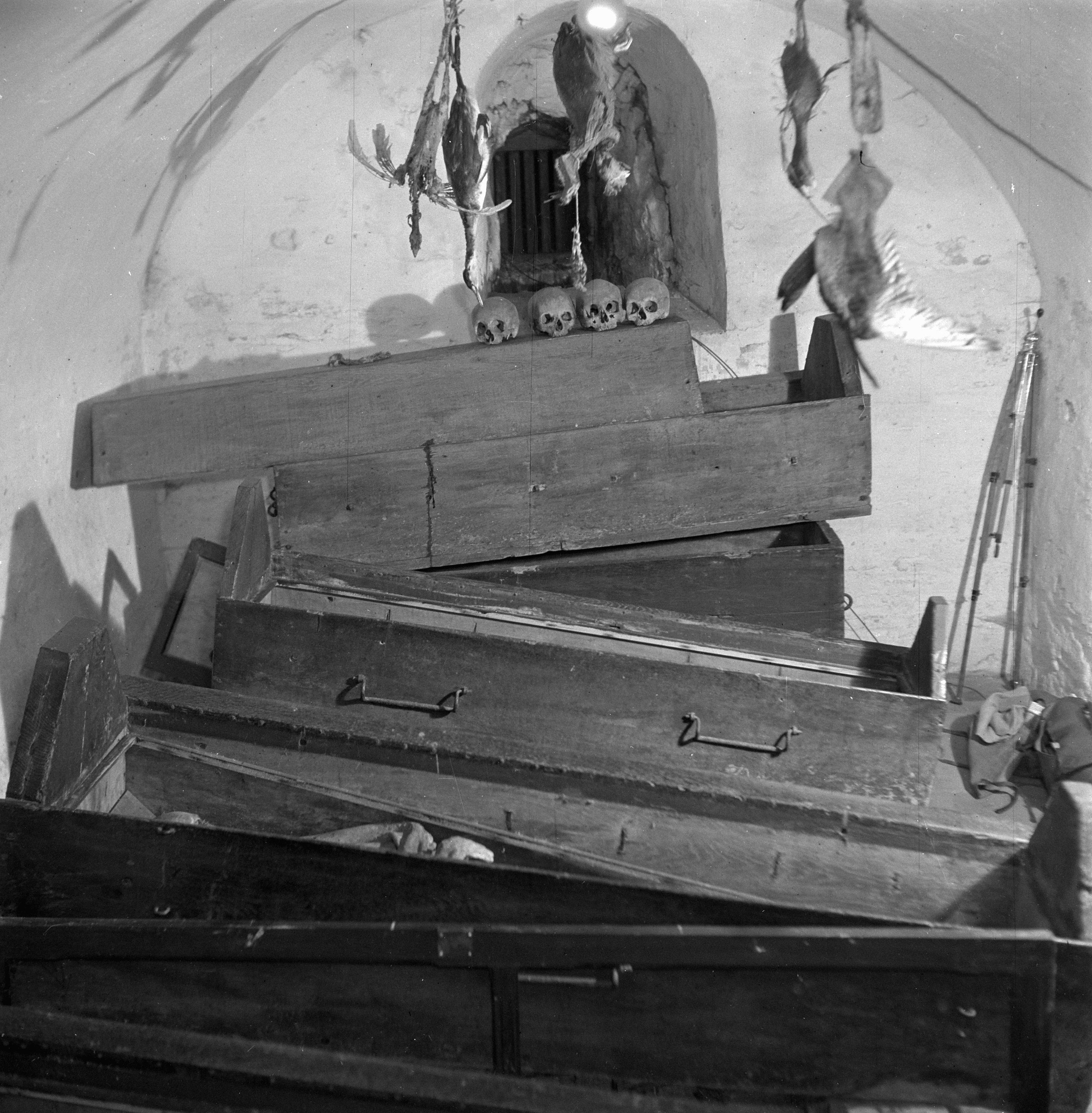
Coffins and mummified birds in the crypt of Wiuwert

The basement of the Nicolas Church of Wiuwert houses four natural mummies dating back to the beginning of the seventeenth century. In the year 1609, the noble Walta family had a crypt built beneath the church for them to be buried in. Some members of the aforementioned Labadist community were also buried in the crypt. In the year 1765, construction crew accidentally rediscovered this crypt with its very well preserved bodies: the bodies were still wearing clothes, and they looked like they had just been buried. There were originally eleven bodies in the crypt, however many had been stolen, leaving just four.

So far, scientists have been unable to pinpoint the cause of the mummification of the bodies. Contributing factors such as the constant low temperature, high humidity and continuous airflow have been mentioned, but never proven. Several birds have been hung on the ceiling as a test and have mummified.

The identity of the mummies is similarly unclear. The four mummies are one young girl (aged 14) that died around 1610 from tuberculosis, a woman that died a peaceful death around 1618, a man who died a painful death due to a dental abscess, and the gold smith Stellingwerf who appears to have died peacefully and was the last to be buried around the year 1705.

A set of ivory dentures was discovered in the basement. Some believe that it belonged to Anna Maria van Schurman, because she was one of the few who could afford and make such a luxury.

== Notable people ==
- Anna Maria van Schurman (1607–1678), painter, poet, and scholar.
- Maria Sybilla Merian (1647-1717), artist, scientist

== Gallery ==
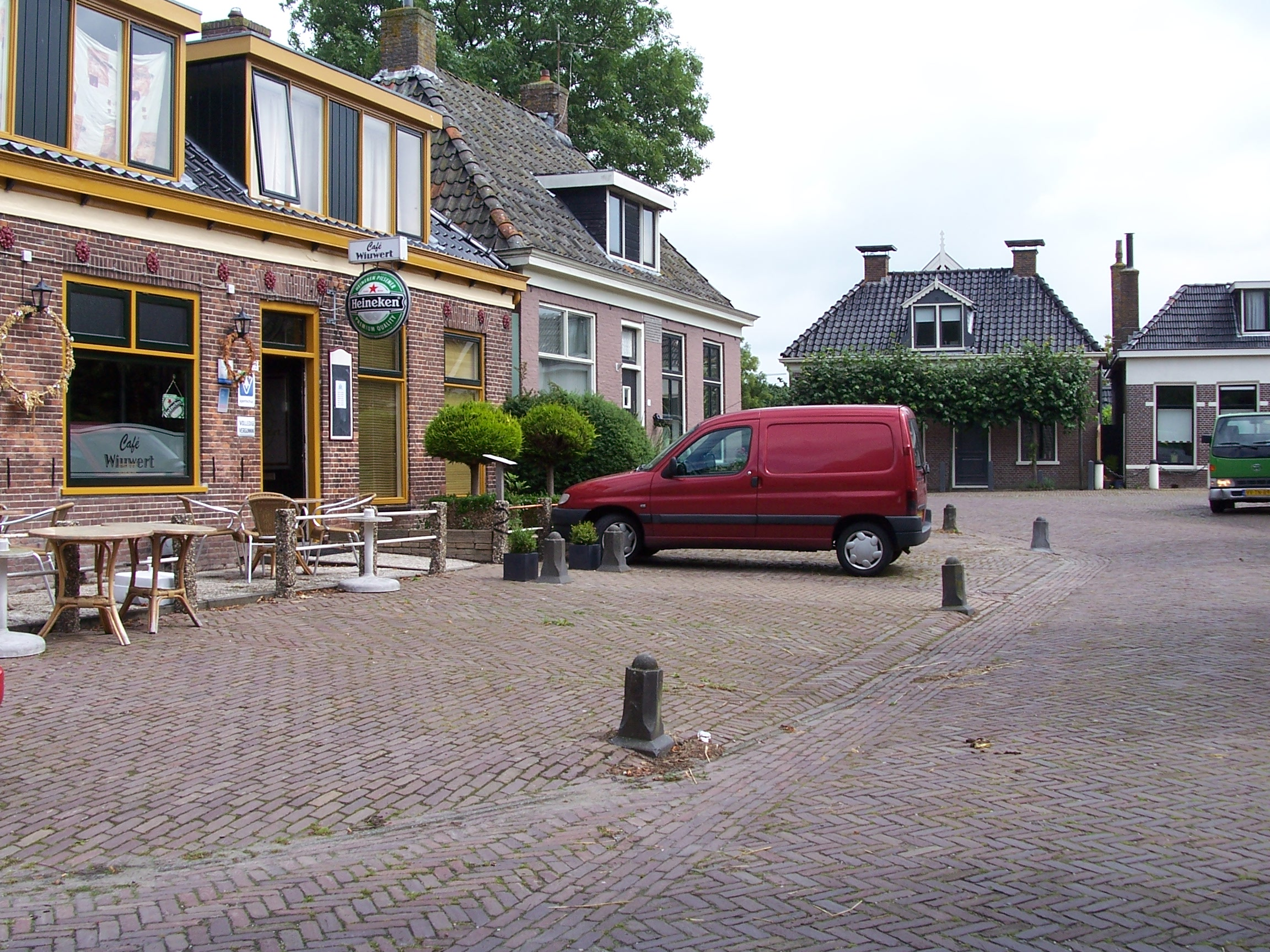
Village square and pub

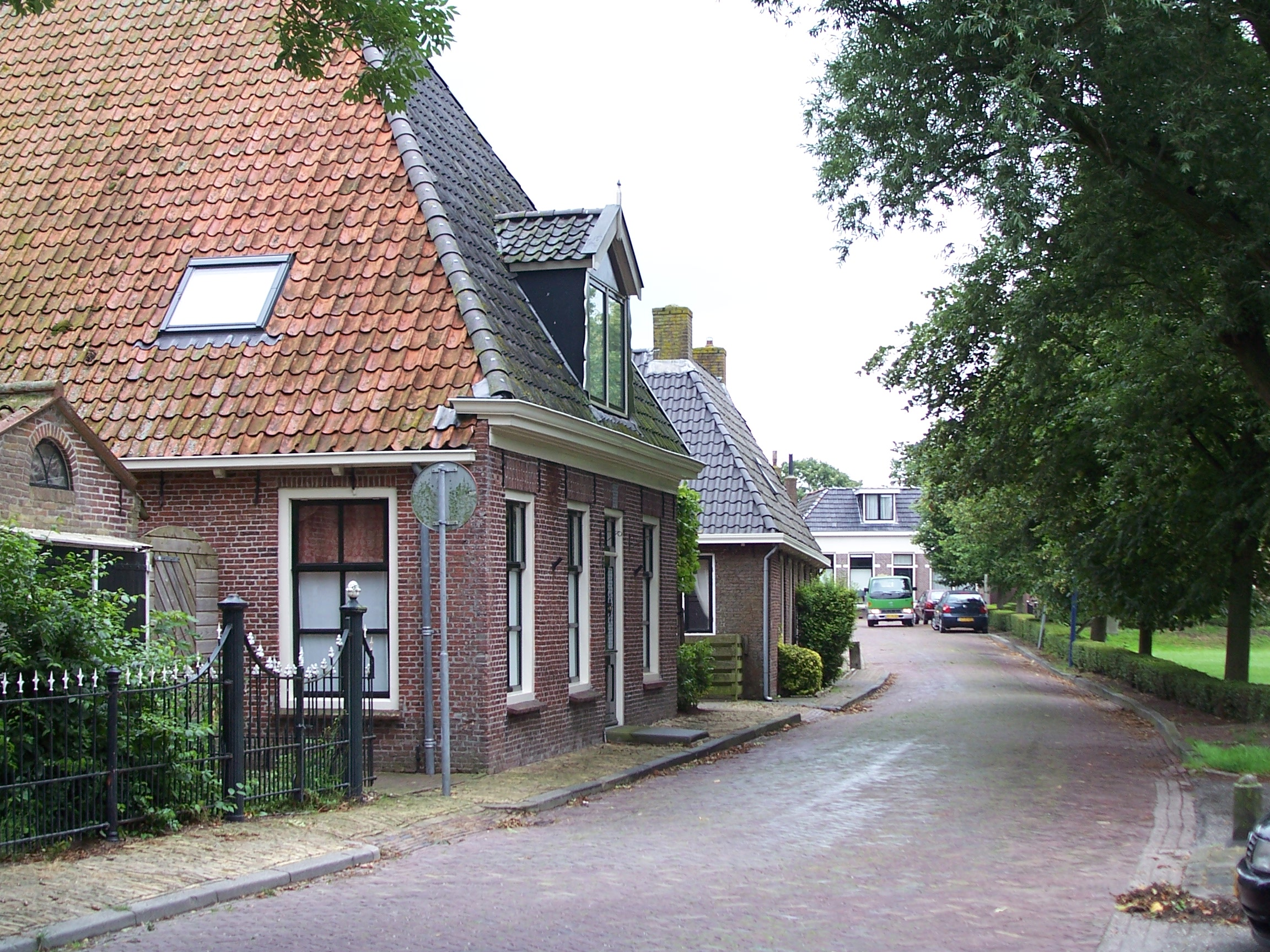
Street of Wiuwert

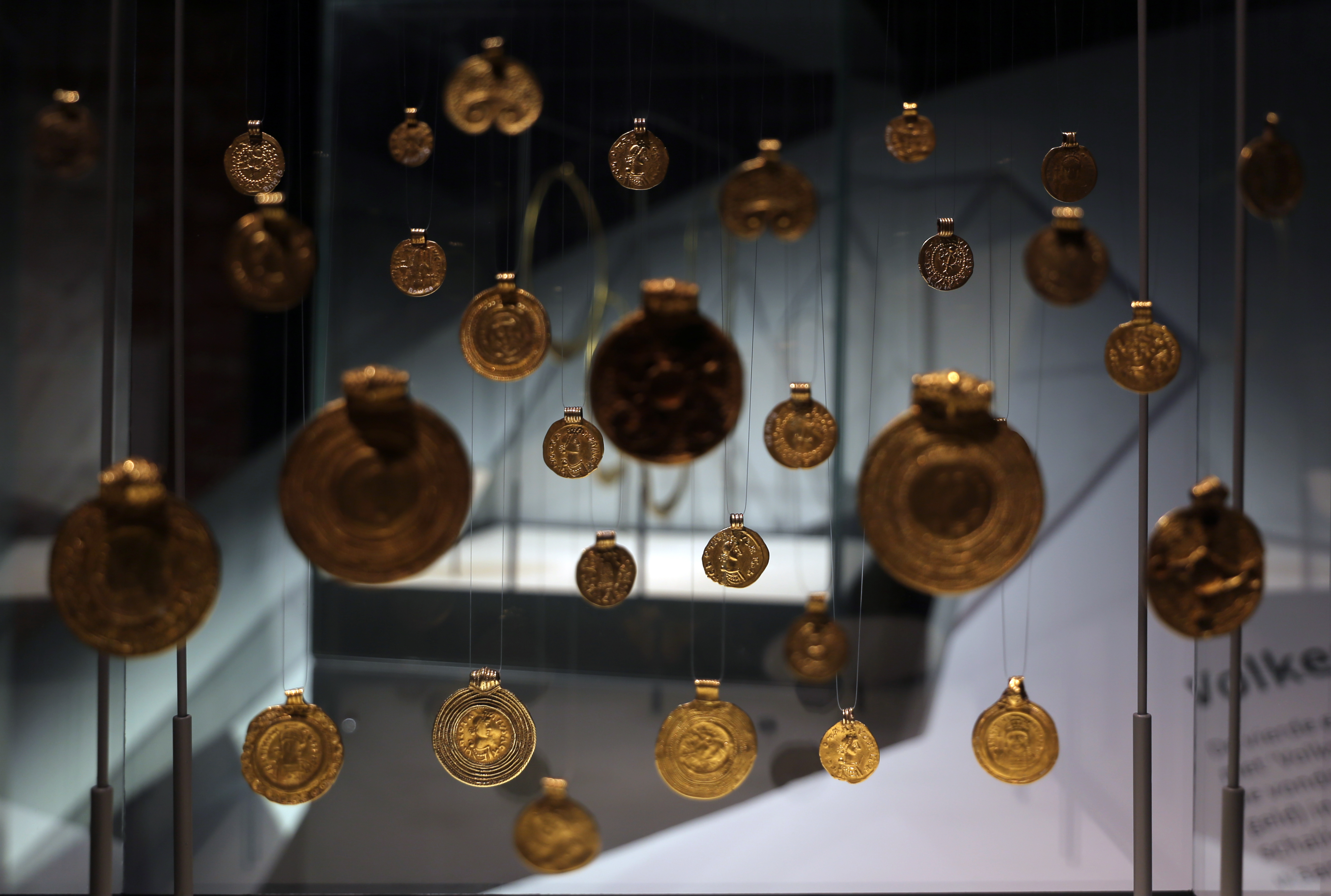
Hoard of Wiuwert

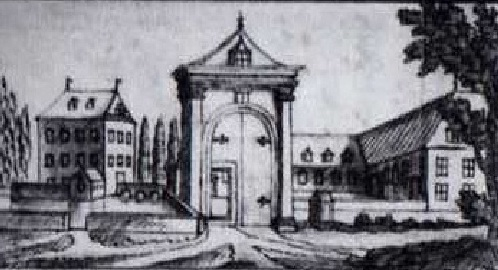
Thetinga State (c. 1686)
