= Johan van Beverwijck =

N. Netherlands physician and writer (1594–1647)

- Johan van Beverwijck
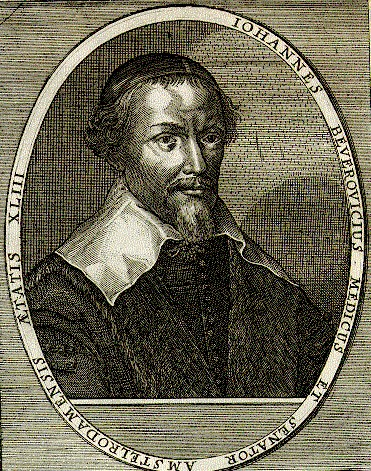
- Born: 17 November 1594
- Died: 19 January 1647 (aged 52)
- Writing career
- Pen name: Johannes Beverovicius

Johan van Beverwijck or Johannes Beverovicius (Dordrecht, 17 November 1594 - 19 January 1647) was a Dutch doctor and writer. Van Beverwijck was interested in new developments and contributed to medical science with his own experiments.

== Biography ==
At the Dordtse Latin School, he was taught rhetoric by Vossius. Johan van Beverwijck studied in Leiden, Paris, Montpellier and Padua, where he obtained his PhD. Around 1618 he settled in his hometown of Dordrecht. He was the first physician in the Netherlands to defend the new ideas of the English physician William Harvey about blood circulation.

== Bibliography ==
- 1635: Lof der chirurgie
- 1636: Schat der gesontheyt
- 1638: Steen-stuck
- 1639: Van de wtnementheyt des vrouwelicken geslachts
- 1642: Inleydinge tot de Hollantsche genees-middelen
- 1642: Schat der ongesontheyt
- 1645: Heel-konste ofte derde deel van de genees-konste
- 1651: Alle de wercken, zo in de medicyne als chirurgie
