= Anna Maria van Schurman =

Dutch artist, classical scholar, philosopher, and feminist (1607-1678)

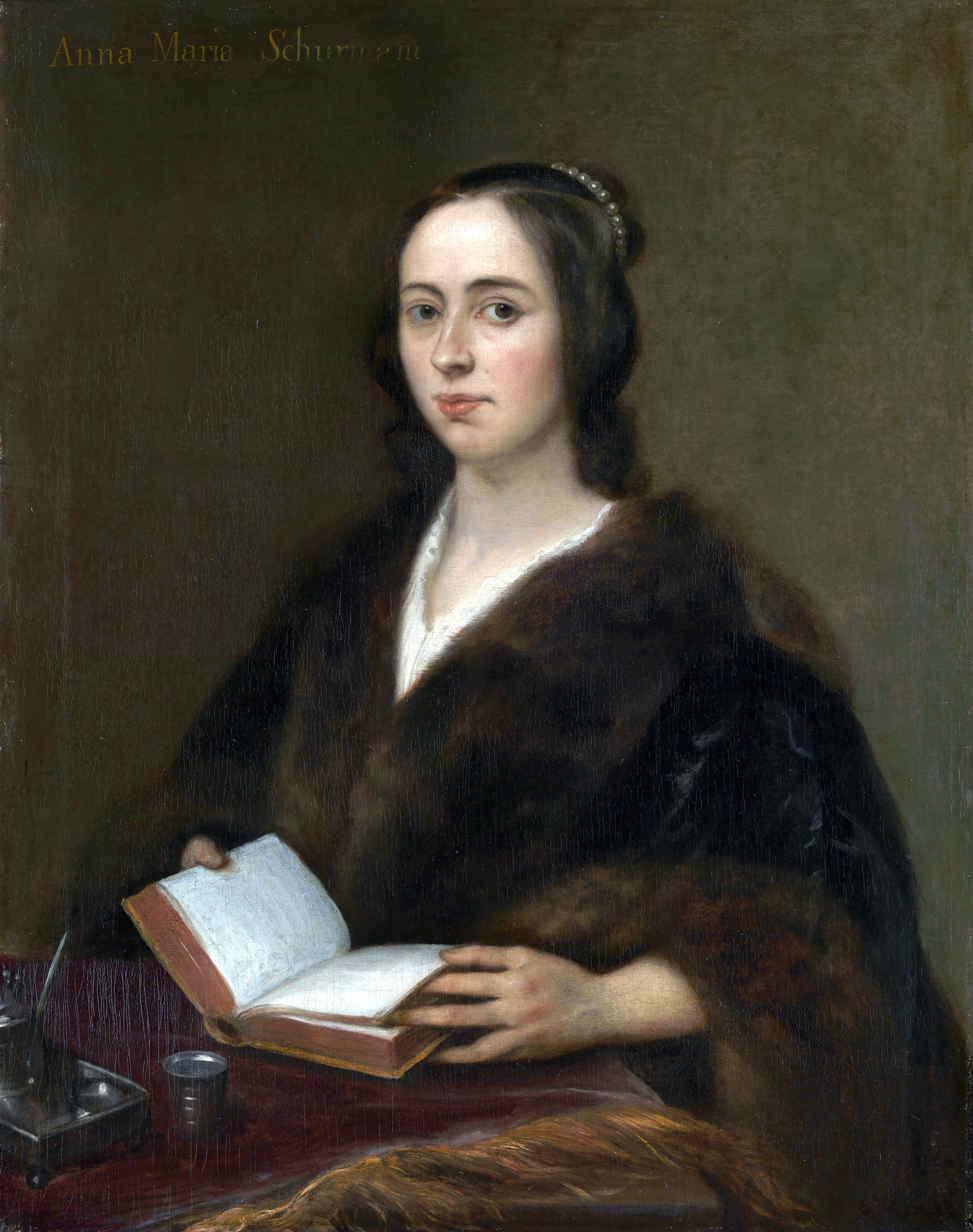
- Anna Maria van Schurman, by Jan Lievens, 1649
- Born: November 5, 1607; Cologne, Holy Roman Empire
- Died: May 4, 1678 (aged 70); Wieuwerd, Dutch Republic
- Education: University of Utrecht
- Style: Painting; Engraving; Poetry

Anna Maria van Schurman (AN-uh muh-REE-uh van SHUR-muhn) (November 5,1607 – May 4,1678) was a Dutch painter, engraver, poet, classical scholar, philosopher, and feminist writer who is best known for her exceptional learning and her defense of female education. She was a highly educated woman, who excelled in art, music, and literature, and became a polyglot proficient in fourteen languages, including Latin, Ancient Greek, Biblical Hebrew, Arabic, Syriac, Aramaic, and Ethiopic, as well as various contemporary European languages. She was the first woman to study, unofficially, at a Dutch university.

== Life ==
=== Early life and education ===
Anna Maria van Schurman was born on 5 November 1607 in Cologne, then part of the Holy Roman Empire, to Frederik van Schurman and Eva von Harff de Dreiborn. She learned to read by the age of four. By six, she was making intricate paper cut-outs, and at ten she reportedly learned embroidery in three hours. She also experimented with wax sculpture, later writing that she had been obliged to discover techniques that nobody could teach her. According to one account, a wax self-portrait she made included a necklace so realistic that her friend, the Princess of Nassau, pricked it with a pin to determine whether it was real.

By 1615, when van Schurman was seven, her family had settled in Utrecht, in the Dutch Republic. Her education took place largely at home, where her father and a private tutor taught the children. She received instruction in reading, writing, arithmetic, music and French. In 1618, at about eleven, her father began teaching her Latin after noticing that she could help her older brothers with their lessons. He gave her works by the Roman philosopher Seneca to read as part of her Latin studies. Van Schurman was subsequently educated alongside her brothers in classical languages and other subjects.

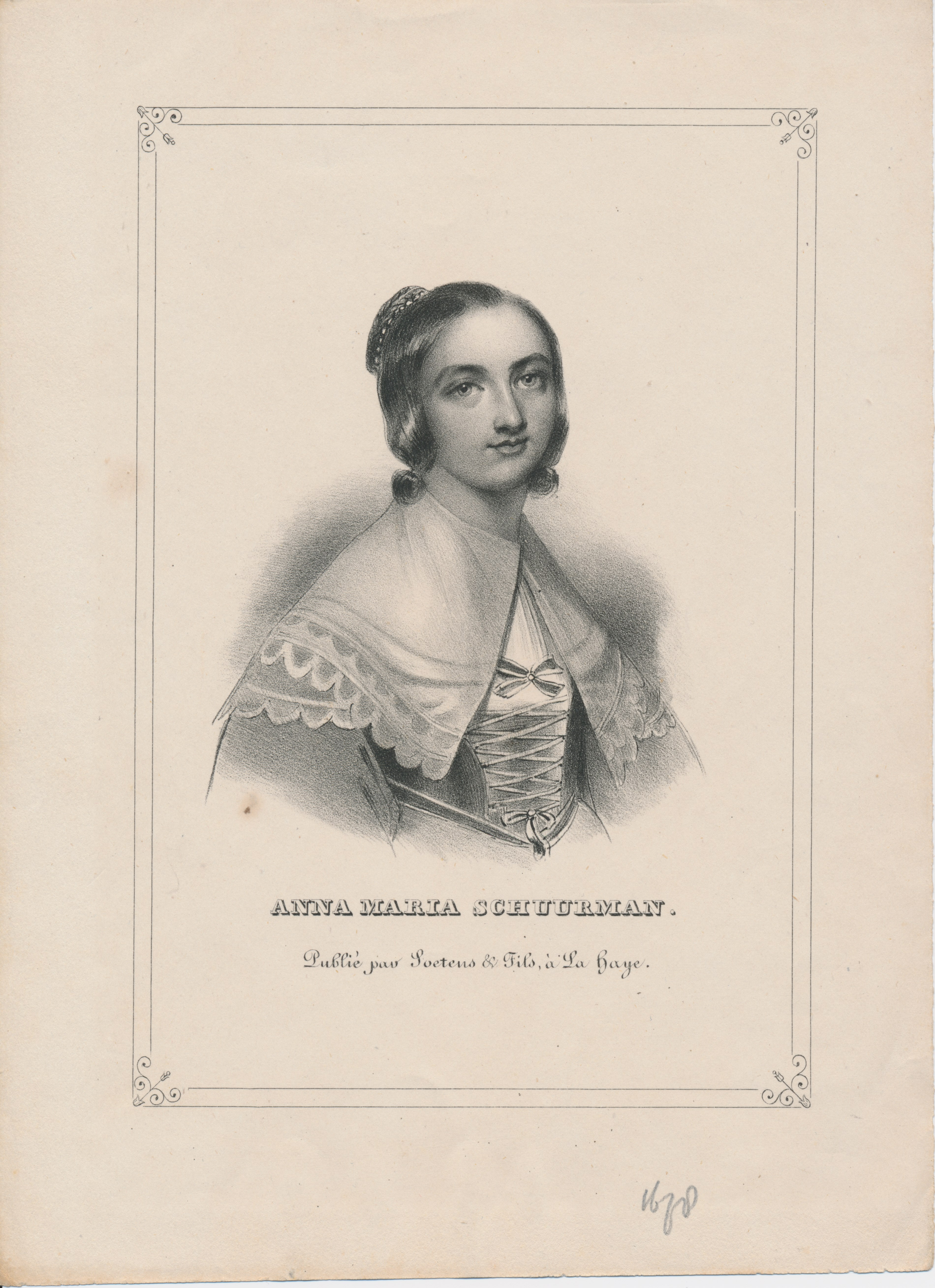
Engraving of Anna Maria van Schurman

In October 1623, shortly before her sixteenth birthday, van Schurman moved with her family to Franeker in Friesland. The town had been home to the University of Franeker since 1585, with faculties of theology, law, medicine, letters and philosophy. Her father and her brother Johan Godschalk van Schurman enrolled at the university on 30 October 1623. The family rented the Martenahuis, where Frederik van Schurman died on 15 November 1623, ten days after Anna Maria's sixteenth birthday. Van Schurman remained in Franeker with her family while Johan Godschalk studied at the university. Through him, she came into contact with university scholars and continued her studies.

=== Intellectual and artistic circle ===
In her 20s, Schurman's home became a meeting point for intellectuals. Among her friends were Constantijn Huygens, Johan van Beverwijck, Jacob de Witt, Cornelius Boy, Margaretha van Godewijk and Utricia Ogle. In the 1630s she studied engraving with Magdalena van de Passe. Combining the techniques of engraving with her skills in calligraphy, her renowned engraved calligraphy pieces gained the attention of all who saw them, including her contemporaries. Despite her playfulness and experimentation, Anna Maria was very serious about her art, and her contemporaries knew it. She herself said that she was "immensely gifted by God in the arts."

=== Utrecht University ===
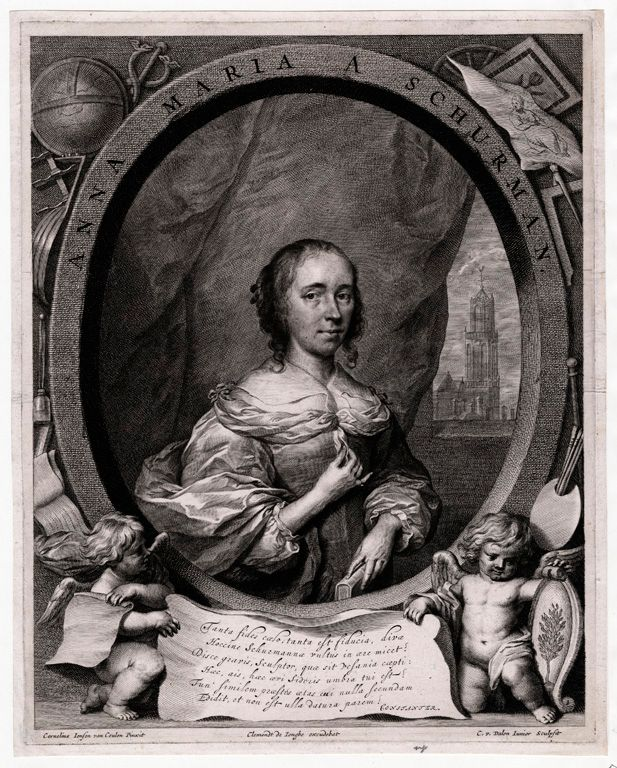
Cornelis van Dalen the Younger after Cornelis Jonson van Ceulen, Anna Maria van Schurman, c. 1657, engraving

In 1636, due to her distinction in Latin, she was invited to write a poem for the opening of the University of Utrecht. In the poem she celebrated the city of Utrecht and the new university. She noted the potential for the university to help the city cope with the economic impacts of the floods and the shifting course of the river Rhine.

She also challenged the exclusion of women from the university. In response to her complaint, the university authorities allowed her to attend professor Voetius' lectures. In 1636 she became the first female student at the university, or at any Dutch university. Women at that time were not permitted to study at a university in Protestant Netherlands, and when she attended lectures she sat behind a screen or in a curtained booth so that the male students could not see her.

At the university she studied Hebrew, Arabic, Chaldee, Syriac and Ethiopic. Her interest in philosophy and theology and her artistic talent contributed to her fame and reputation as the "Star of Utrecht". By the 1640s she was fluent in 14 languages and wrote in Latin, Greek, Hebrew, Italian, French, Arabic, Persian, Ethiopic, German and Dutch. Schurman made an Ethiopic grammar for her own study which consisted of two volumes, the first on reading, and the second on nouns and verbs.

== The Labadists ==
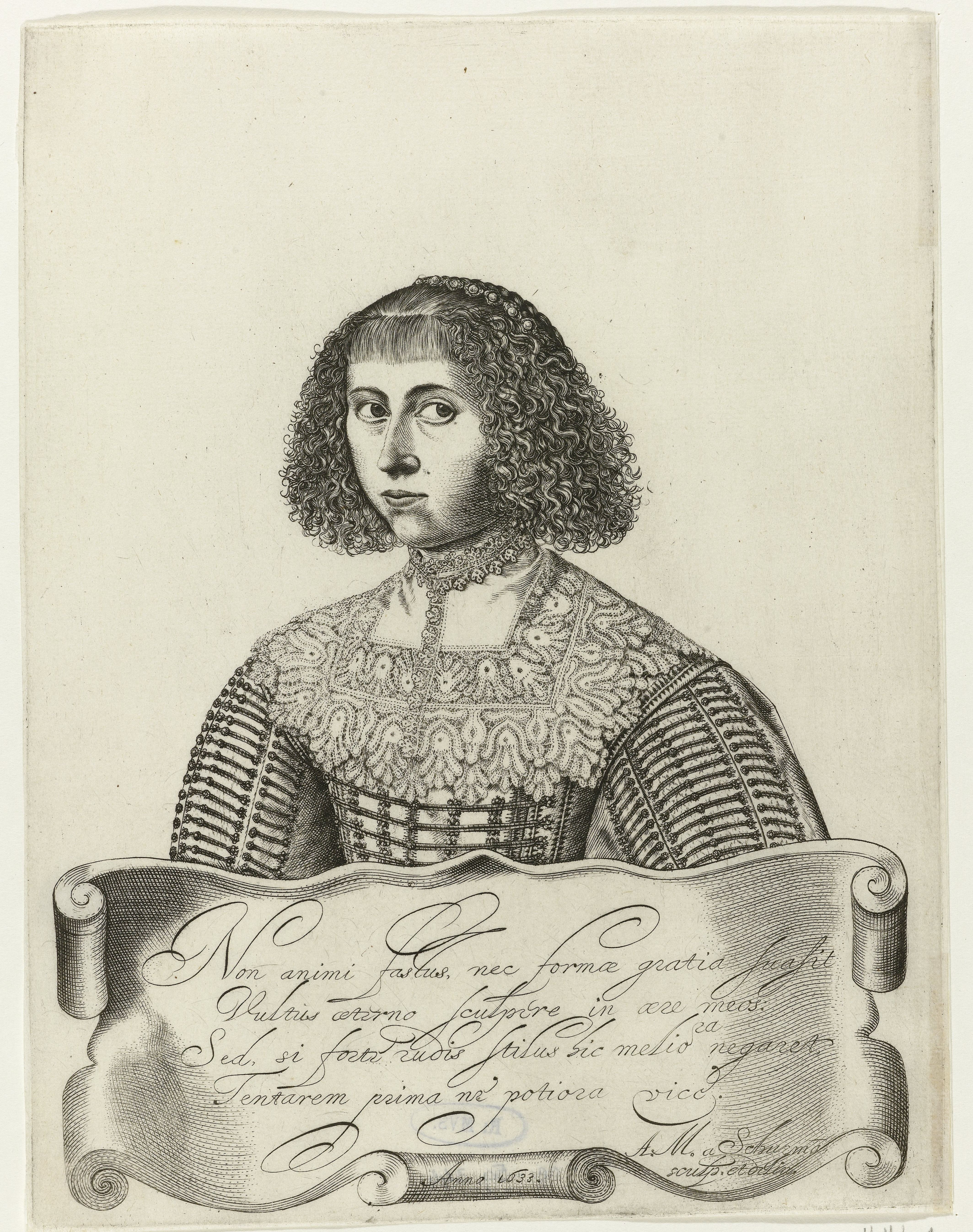
Self portrait, 1633

In her 60s, Schurman emerged as one of the principal leaders of the Labadists. In the 1660s Schurman had become increasingly disillusioned with the Reformed Churches in the Netherlands. She made the reformation of the church her goal. Along with corresponding with ministers, she travelled throughout the country and organised meetings with them. She lamented the lack of spiritual devotion and the "exhibits of the ecclesiastics" that occupied the church's pulpits.

In 1661 Schurman's brother studied theology with the Hebrew scholar Johannes Buxtorf in Basel and learned about the defrocked French priest Jean de Labadie. He travelled to Geneva to meet him. In 1662 he corresponded with Schurman at length about Labadie's teachings. When Labadie and a small number of followers stopped over in Utrecht on the way to Middelburg, they lodged in Schurman's house. Labadie became the pastor of Middelburg, preaching millenarianism, arguing for moral regeneration and that believers should live apart from unbelievers. Schurman supported him even when he was removed as a pastor. When in late 1669 Labadie settled in Amsterdam to establish a separatist church, Schurman sold her house and part of her library. She joined Labadie's sectarian community. In March 1669 she broke with the Reformed Church when she published a 10-page pamphlet On the Reformation necessary at present in the Church of Christ. She denounced the church men for trampling on "celestial wisdom", arguing that the people of God should be separated from the "mondains" through "hatred of the world" and "divine love".

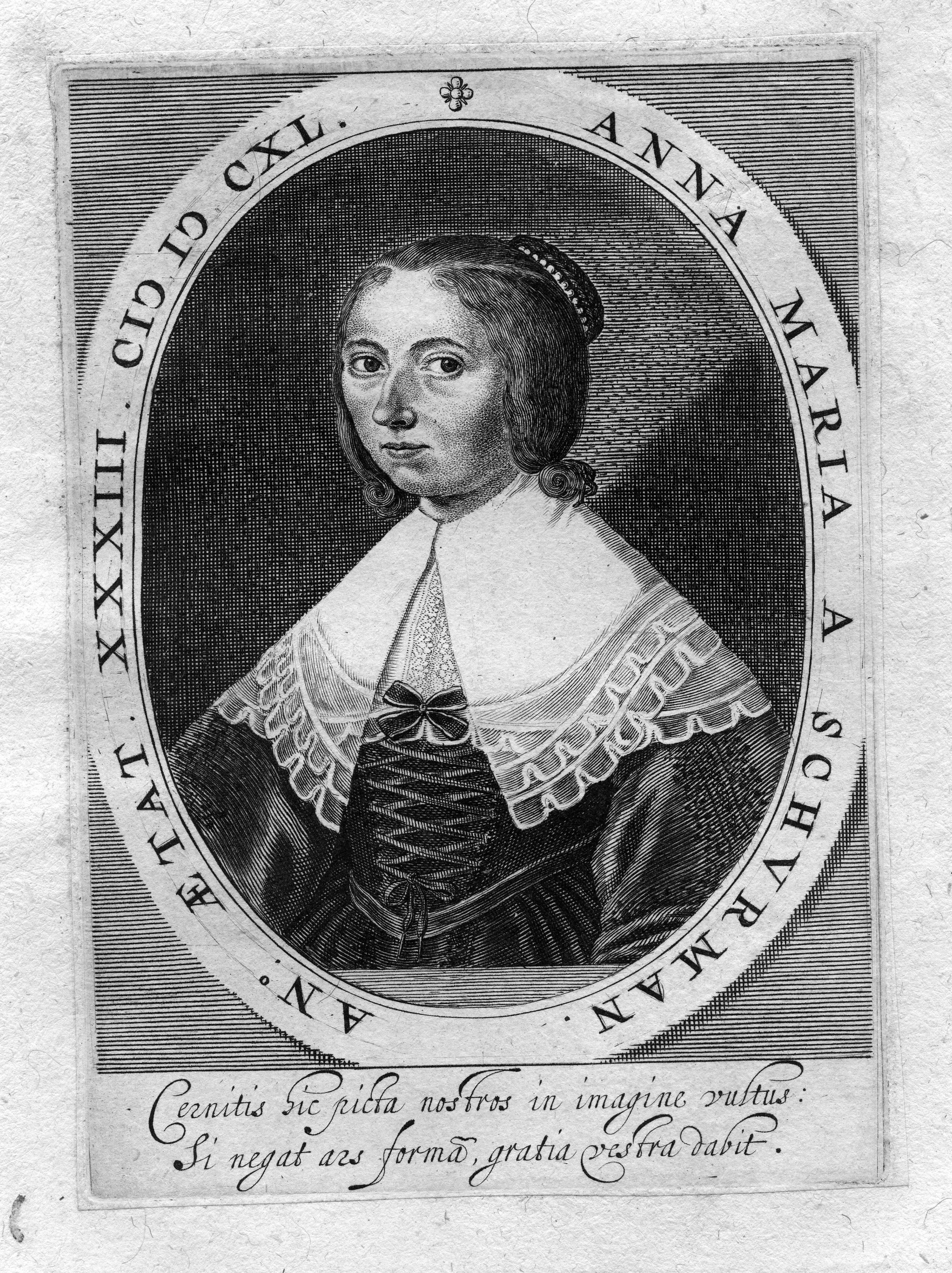
Self-portrait engraving, 1640

A public smear campaign followed. Schurman was attacked by her intellectual friends, including Huygens and Voetius. Her writing style became forthright and confident. When the Labadists had to leave Amsterdam, Schurman secured an invitation from her friend Princess Elisabeth of Bohemia, who in 1667 had become abbess at the Lutheran Damenstift of Herford Abbey. The 50 Labadists lived there between 1670 and 1672. At Herdford Schurman continued her art work and the Labadists maintained a printing press. Schurman was referred to by the Labadists as Mama, Labadie as Papa. Rumours had it that Labadie and Schurman had married; however, he married Lucia van Sommelsdijck. In 1672 the Labadists moved to Altona in Denmark, as Elisabeth of Bohemia had advocated on their behalf in correspondence with the King of Denmark.

When Labadie died in 1674, Schurman investigated the possibility of moving to England, corresponding with the Latin scholar Lucy Hutchinson and the theologian John Owen on the matter. But the Labadists moved to the village Wieuwerd in Friesland and attracted numerous new members, including Maria Sibylla Merian. About 400 Labadists practiced absolute detachment from worldly values. They attempted to return to early church practices, sharing all property.

== Art ==
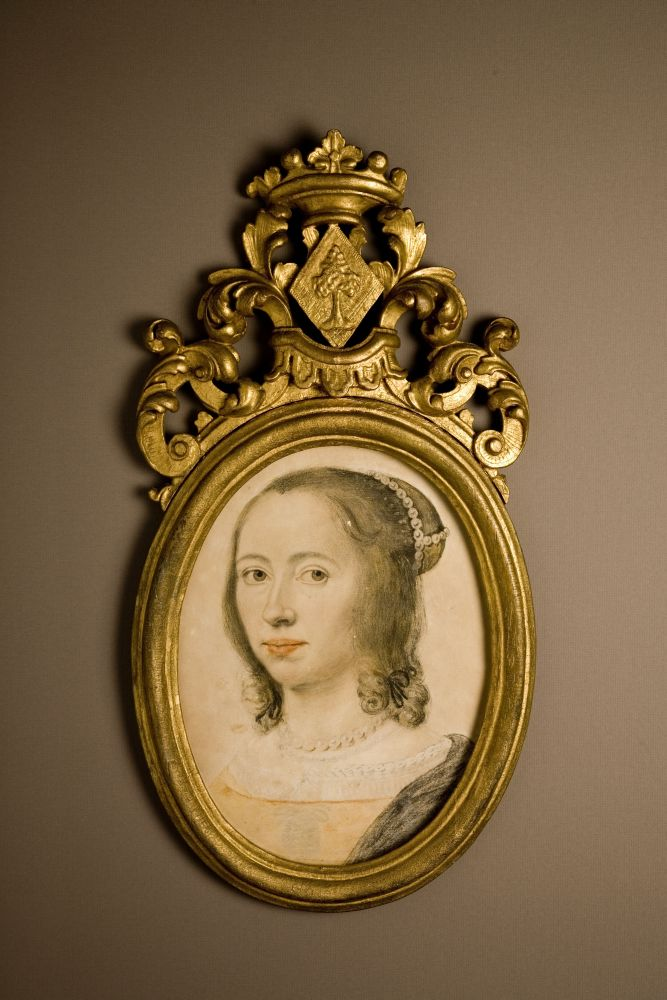
Pastel self-portrait, 1640

Van Schurman began making art as a child, alongside the academic studies she pursued at home. She learned painting, calligraphy, papercutting, embroidery and wood carving, and experimented with wax sculpture. In the 1630s, when she was in her 20s, she studied drawing and engraving with Magdalena van de Passe in Utrecht.

As an adult, van Schurman continued to work across several media. She made drawings, paintings and engravings, as well as small portraits in pastel and oil and sculptures in materials including boxwood and wax. She also engraved calligraphy on glass using a diamond point. By 1643, when she was about 35, her work had gained formal recognition in Utrecht: the city's Guild of Saint Luke gave her honorary membership in recognition of her artistic abilities.

Van Schurman also made numerous self-portraits. In 1633, while in her mid-20s, she made her first known engraving, a self-portrait in which her hands were concealed behind a cartouche. The detail caught the attention of her friend Constantijn Huygens, who wrote several poems asking why she had hidden them. Seven years later, in 1640, van Schurman produced another engraved self-portrait, again with her hands concealed. This time she added the Latin inscription "Cernitis hic picta nostros in imagine vultus: si negat ars formā[m], gratia vestra dabit", translated as "See my likeness depicted in this portrait: May your favor perfect the work where art has failed."

== Published writings ==
Many of Schurman's writings were published during her lifetime in multiple editions, although some of her writings have been lost.

=== Nobiliss ===
Her most famous book was the Nobiliss. Virginis Annae Mariae a Schurman Opuscula Hebraea Graeca Latina et Gallica, Prosaica et Metrica (Minor works in Hebrew, Greek, Latin and French in prose and poetry by the most noble Anne Maria van Schurman). It was published 1648 by Friedrich Spanheim, professor of theology at Leiden University through the Leiden-based publisher Elzeviers.

=== The Learned Maid ===
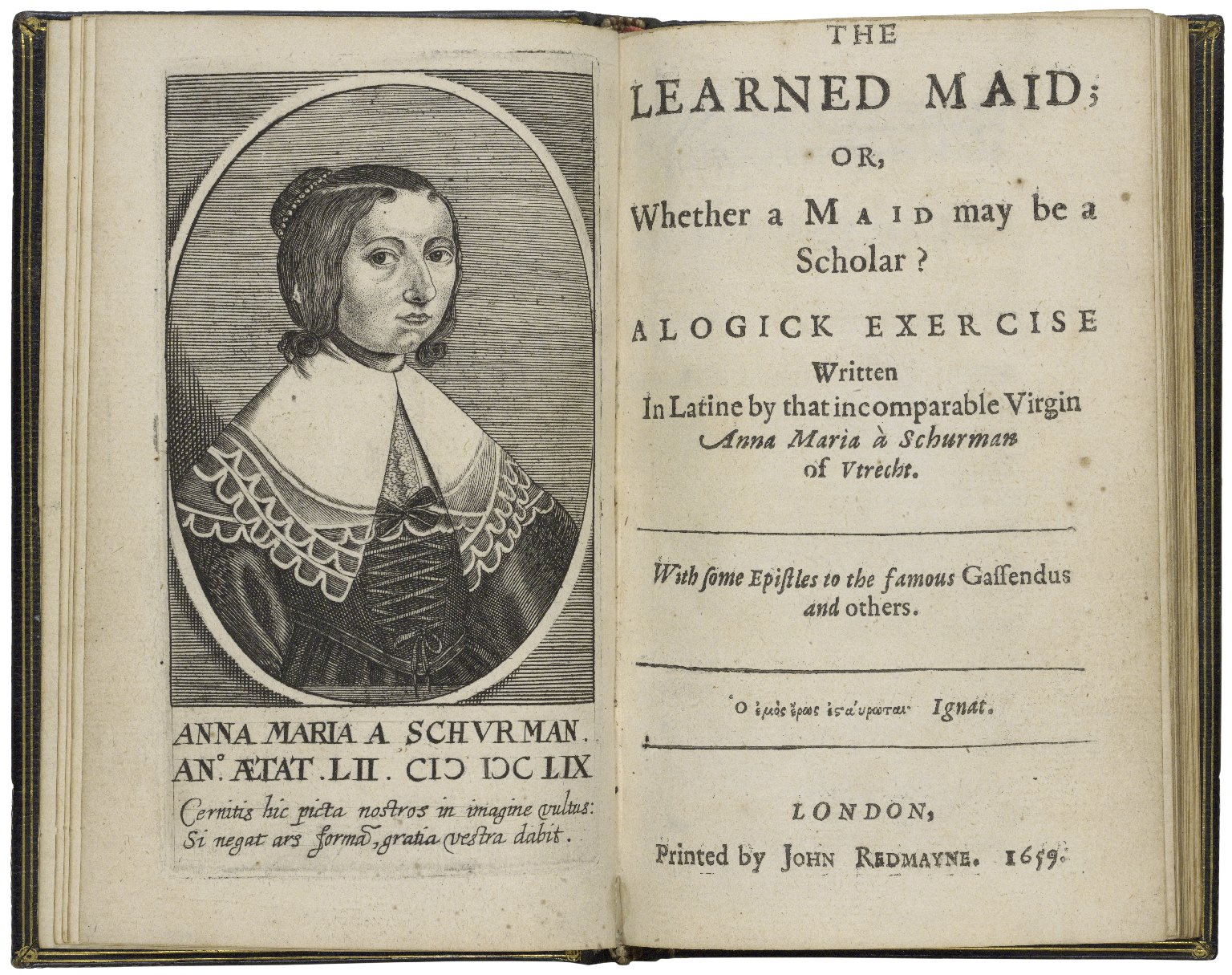
Frontispiece and title page of the 1659 English edition of The Learned Maid

The Learned Maid; or, Whether a Maid may be a Scholar? was the title of a 1659 English translation of van Schurman's argument for women's education. Published in London when she was 51, the book was translated by English clergyman Clement Barksdale from a Latin work van Schurman had published nearly 20 years earlier.

Van Schurman had begun developing the argument in her early 30s. One important debate was with André Rivet, a French Protestant theologian and professor at Leiden University who was more than 30 years her senior. Their correspondence about women's capacity for scholarship appeared in Latin in Paris in 1638 as Amica Dissertatio. Three years later, in 1641, the Elzevir press in Leiden published van Schurman's more systematic treatment of the subject, the Dissertatio de ingenii muliebris ad doctrinam, et meliores litteras aptitudine, together with letters on the same subject.

Van Schurman asked whether scholarly study was appropriate for a Christian woman. Her answer was yes. She argued that women had the intellectual capacity to study the arts and sciences and pointed to women who had already become accomplished scholars as evidence. One of her examples was Lady Jane Grey, the highly educated English queen who was executed in 1554. Van Schurman also argued that education encouraged virtue and could make women's lives happier and more useful. Her proposed course of study was broad, including languages, history, philosophy and the sciences, although she placed particular importance on the Bible and theology.

Her argument had clear limits. Van Schurman advocated advanced education for Christian women who had the ability and leisure to study, particularly women of the upper classes, rather than universal education for women and girls. She also accepted restrictions on women's use of education in public life.

The argument circulated beyond the Dutch Republic for more than 20 years. A French translation appeared in Paris within several years of the 1641 Latin edition. Barksdale's 1659 English version contained van Schurman's logical argument but not the full correspondence with Rivet, and also included several of her letters to other scholars.

=== Eukleria ===
In 1673, four years after joining the Labadists, van Schurman published the first part of Eukleria, or Choosing the Better Part in Altona, where the Labadist community was then living. The 207-page Latin work was partly autobiographical. Van Schurman described and defended the path that had led her to join the Labadists, while looking critically at the scholarly and artistic life for which she had previously been known.

The title refers to the Gospel of Luke. In Luke 10:42, Mary of Bethany, a follower of Jesus, is said to have chosen "the better part" by sitting at his feet and listening to him. Van Schurman used the passage to explain her own choice of a life centred on religious devotion.

Van Schurman also recalled a disagreement with Gisbertus Voetius, a Dutch Reformed theologian and one of her former teachers, over her admiration for Saint Paula. Paula was a fourth-century Roman Christian who became a follower of the theologian Jerome and joined him in Bethlehem. Voetius had objected to van Schurman's admiration for Paula as inappropriate for a woman.

Eukleria also found readers outside the Labadist community. It was favourably received by German philosopher and mathematician Gottfried Wilhelm Leibniz and by leading Pietists, including German lawyer Johann Jacob Schütz and Lutheran theologian Philipp Jakob Spener.

Van Schurman continued working on Eukleria during the last five years of her life. After her death in 1678, a 206-page second part continuing the account of her life to her death was published posthumously in Amsterdam in 1685.

== Published works ==
Amica Dissertatio inter Annam Mariam Schurmanniam et Andr. Rivetum de capacitate ingenii muliebris ad scientias. Paris, s.n., 1638.

Dissertatio De Ingenii Muliebris ad Doctrinam et meliores Litteras aptitudine (Lugdunum Batavorum, 1641) – with letters on the same theme.

Dissertatio De Ingenii Muliebris ad Doctrinam et meliores Litteras aptitudine. Accedunt Quaedam Epistolae eiusdem Argumenti.Lugdunum Batavorum: Elzeviriana, 1641. Herdruk in Opuscula 1648; 1650; 1652; 1749.

Question célèbre, s’il est nécessaire ou non que les Filles soient Savantes. Le tout mis en François par le Sr. Colletet.Paris: Rolet le Duc, 1646..

The Learned Maid, or Whether a Maid may be a Scholar. A Logick Exercise.London: John Redmayne, 1659.

Paelsteen van den tijd onses levens (Stone of the Time of Our Life) (Dordrecht, 1639)

Opuscula Hebraea, Graeca, Latina, Gallica: prosaica et metrica (Leiden, 1648; Utrecht, 1652)

Eukleria (1685)

"De Vitæ Termino" (On the End of Life). Published in Leiden, 1639. Translated into Dutch as "Pael-steen van den tijt onses levens," published in Dordrecht, 1639.

Opuscula Hebræa, Græca, Latina, Gallica. Prosaica et Metrica. Utrecht. 1648. This is an edition of her collected works, including correspondence in French, Latin, Greek and Hebrew, were published by the house of Elsevier, edited by Friedrich Spanheim, another disciple of Labadie. Volume was reprinted in 1650, 1652, 1723 and 1749.

== Death ==
In the final years of her life Schurman was housebound due to severe rheumatism. She died aged 70 in 1678. She was buried in Wieuwerd church, Friesland, Netherlands.

== Tributes ==
- Judy Chicago's feminist artwork The Dinner Party (1979) features a place setting for van Schurman.
- Between 2000 and 2018, a marble bust of van Schurman was situated in the atrium of the House of Representatives of the Dutch Parliament in The Hague.
- Van Schurman's name is shown on a blackboard showing a list of the most worthy people for a new version of The Good Place in episode 11 of the fourth season.

== See also ==
- History of feminism
- List of Orientalist artists
- Orientalism
