= Jean de Labadie =

French Pietist

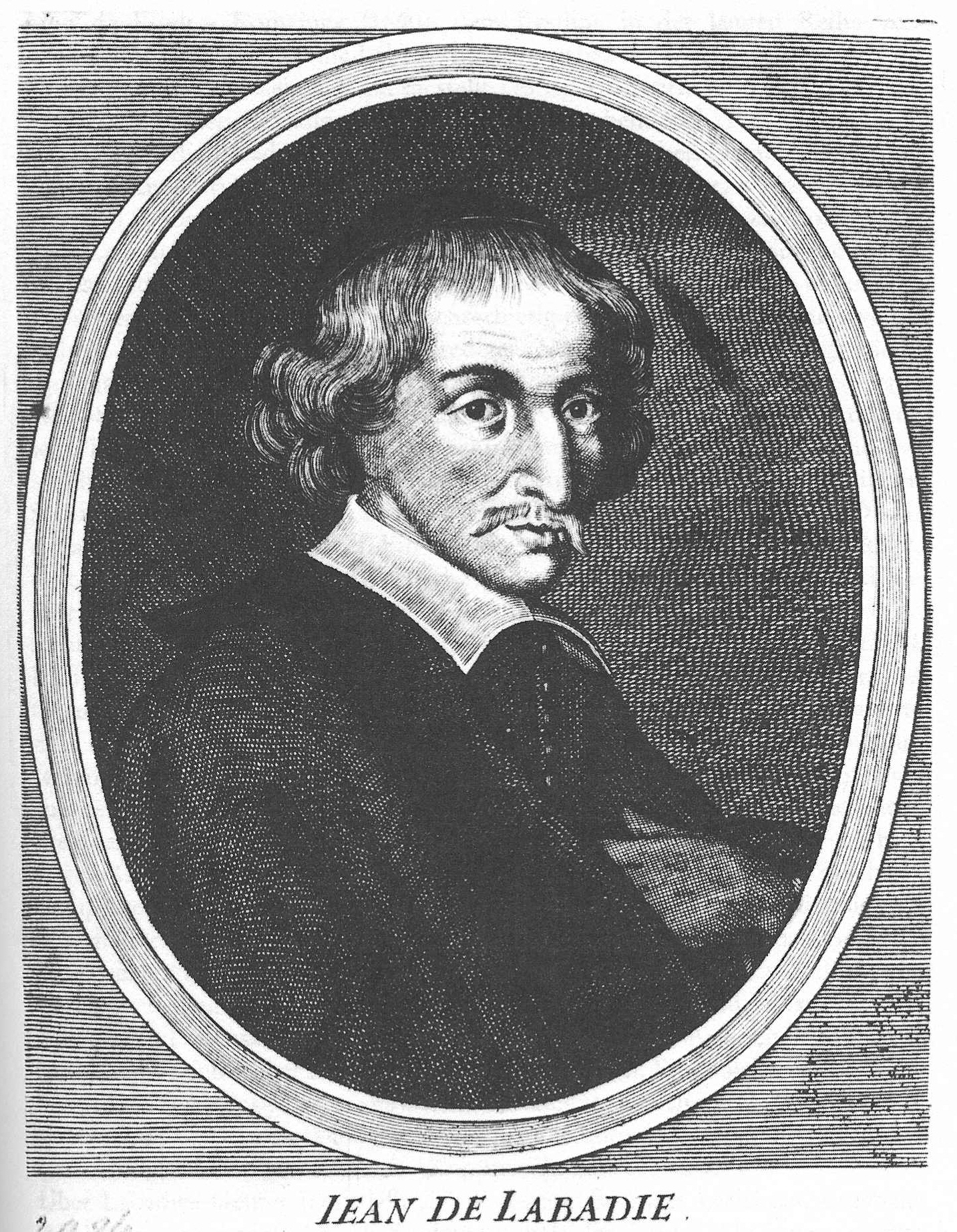
- Born: 13 February 1610; Bourg, Kingdom of France
- Died: 13 February 1674 (aged 64); Altona, Duchy of Holstein

Jean de Labadie (13 February 1610 – 13 February 1674) was a 17th-century French Pietist. Originally a Jesuit priest, he became a member of the Reformed Church in 1650, before founding the community which became known as the Labadists in 1669. At its height the movement numbered around 600 with thousands of adherents further afield. It attracted some notable female converts such as the famed poet and scholar Anna Maria van Schurman and the entomological artist Maria Merian.

Labadie combined the influences of Jansenism, Precicianism, and Reformed Pietism, developing a form of radical Christianity with an emphasis upon holiness and Christian communal living. Labadie's teachings gained hold in the Netherlands.

== Life ==
The son of an officer, he entered the Jesuit Order in 1625, was ordained in 1635, but left in 1639 due to poor health and tensions with the other brothers. He then worked as a diocesan priest in Bordeaux, Paris and Amiens. He turned to Jansenism and intensive study of the Bible, and began to be drawn to Calvinism. He regarded himself as divinely inspired. Cardinal Mazarin had him transferred to southern France in 1646 as a disturber of the peace, where he changed his allegiance to the Reformed Church in 1650 at Montauban.

He served as a pastor and professor of theology at Montauban from 1652 to 1657. In 1659 he was pastor in Geneva, where he gathered around him disciples notably; Pierre Yvon Pierre Dulignon, François Menuret, and Friedrich Theodor Untereyck Spanheim.

In 1666 he was appointed preacher at Middelburg in the Netherlands, but in 1669 was dismissed for his theological views. He then founded a house church in Amsterdam which served as a model for later foundations, but which was persecuted. He moved on, in 1670, with his pupil Anna Maria van Schurman and his congregation into a house in Herford, Germany, provided as a refuge for persecuted spiritualists by Elisabeth of the Palatinate, the Calvinist abbess of the Lutheran convent in that city. Here, too, he was pressed and harassed, and in 1672 he left and walked to Altona, Duchy of Holstein. Labadie died in 1674 in that German city which belonged then to the Danish crown. The movement continued both in Europe and America, but had dissipated by 1732.

== Works ==
Labadie's most influential writing was The Reform of the Church Through the Pastorate (1667).

- Introduction à la piété dans les Mystères, Paroles et ceremonies de la Messe, Amiens, 1642.
- Odes sacrées sur le Très-adorable et auguste Mystère du S. Sacrement de l'Autel, Amiens, 1642.
- Traité de la Solitude chrestienne, ou la vie retirée du siècle, Paris, 1645.
- Déclaration de Jean de Labadie, cy-devant prestre, predicateur et chanoine d'Amiens, contenant les raisons qui l'ont obligé à quitter la communion de l'Eglise Romaine pour se ranger à celle de l'Eglise Réformée, Montauban, 1650.
- Lettre de Jean de Labadie à ses amis de la Communion Romaine touchant sa Declaration, Montauban, 1651.
- Les Elevations d'esprit à Dieu, ou Contemplations fort instruisantes sur les plus grands Mysteres de la Foy, Montauban, 1651.
- Les Entretiens d'esprit durant le jour; ou Reflexions importantes sur la vie humaine, ...sur le Christianisme, ...sur le besoin de la Reformation de ses Moeurs, Montauban, 1651.
- Le Bon Usage de l'Eucharistie, Montauban, 1656.
- Practique des Oraisons, mentale et vocale..., Montauban, 1656.
- Recueil de quelques Maximes importantes de Doctrine, de Conduite et de Pieté Chrestienne, Montauban, 1657 (Geneva, 1659).
- Les Saintes Décades de Quatrains de Pieté Chretienne touchant à la connoissance de Dieu, son honneur, son amour et l'union de l'âme avec lui, Orange, 1658 (Geneva, 1659, Amsterdam, 1671).
- La pratique de l'oraison et meditation Chretienne, Geneva, 1660.
- Le Iûne religieus ou le moyen de le bien faire, Geneva, 1665.
- Jugement charitable et juste sur l'état present des Juifs, Amsterdam 1667.
- Le Triomphe de l'Eucharistie, ou la vraye doctrine du St. Sacrement, avec les moyens d'y bien participer, Amsterdam, 1667.
- Le Héraut du Grand Roy Jesus, ou Eclaircissement de la doctrine de Jean de Labadie, pasteur, sur le Règne glorieux de Jésus-Christ et de ses saints en la terre aux derniers temps, Amsterdam, 1667.
- L'Idée d'un bon pasteur et d'une bonne Eglise, Amsterdam, 1667.
- Les Divins Herauts de la Penitence au Monde..., Amsterdam, 1667.
- La Reformation de l'Eglise par le Pastorat, Middelburg, 1667.
- Le Veritable Exorcisme, Amsterdam, 1667.
- Le Discernement d'une Veritable Eglise suivant l'Ecriture Sainte, Amsterdam, 1668.
- La Puissance eclesiastique bornée à l'Ecriture et par Elle..., Amsterdam, 1668.
- Manuel de Pieté, Middelburg 1668.
- Declaration Chrestienne et sincère de plusieurs Membres de l'Eglise de Dieu et de Jésus-Christ touchant les Justes Raisons et les Motifs qui les obligent à n'avoir point de Communion avec le synode dit Vualon, La Haye, 1669.
- Points fondamentaux de la vie vraimant Chretiene, Amsterdam 1670.
- Abrégé du Veritable Christianisme et Téoretique et pratique..., Amsterdam, 1670.
- Le Chant Royal du Grand Roy Jésus, ou les Hymnes et Cantiques de l'Aigneau..., Amsterdam, 1670.
- Receüil de diverses Chansons Spiritüeles, Amsterdam, 1670.
- L'Empire du S. Esprit sur les Ames..., Amsterdam, 1671.
- Eclaircissement ou Declaration de la Foy et de la pureté des sentimens en la doctrine des Srs. Jean de Labadie, Pierre Yvon, Pierre Dulignon..., Amsterdam, 1671.
- Veritas sui vindex, seu solemnis fidei declaratio..., Herfordiae, 1672.
- Jesus revelé de nouveau..., Altona, 1673.
- Fragmens de quelques poesies et sentimens d'esprit..., Amsterdam, 1678.
- Poésies sacrées de l'amour divin, Amsterdam, 1680.
- Recueil de Cantiques spirituels, Amsterdam, 1680.
- Le Chretien regeneré ou nul, Amsterdam, 1685.

== See also ==
- Labadists
- Anna Maria van Schurman
- Maria Sibylla Merian
- Elisabeth of the Palatinate
