= Žirmūnai =

- Eldership
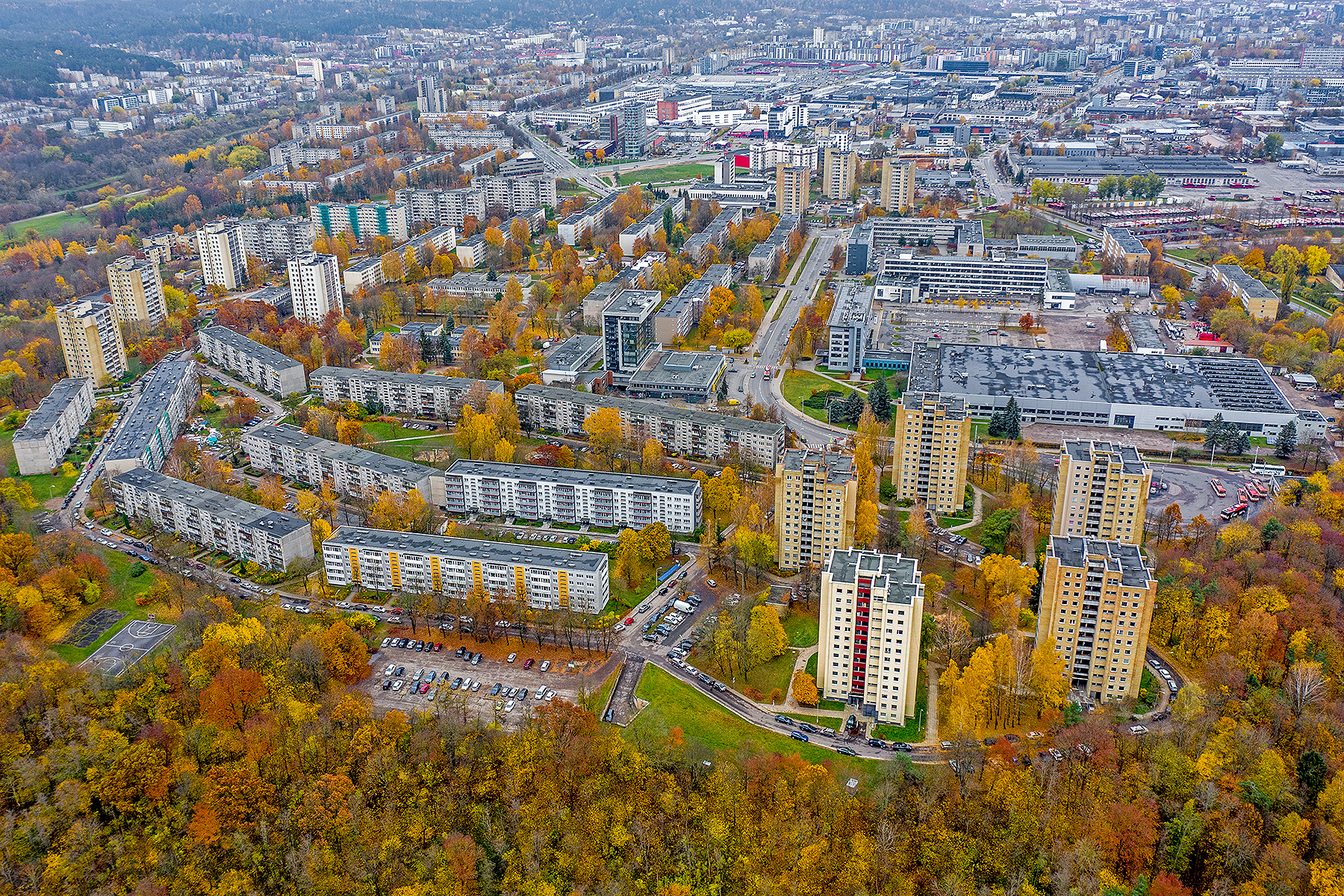
- Žirmūnai microdistrict

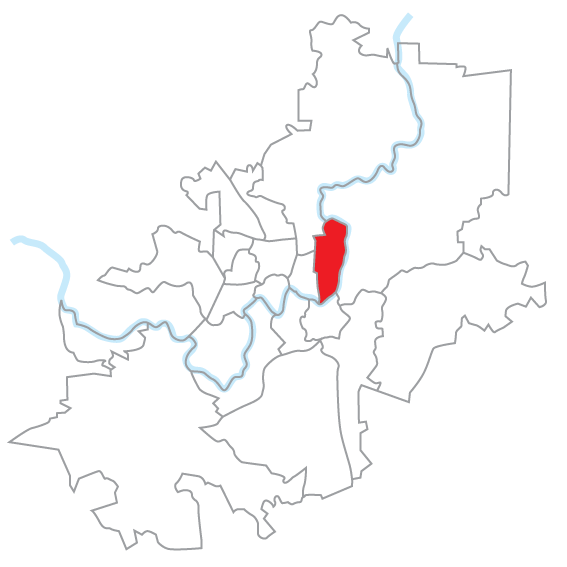
- Country: Lithuania
- County: Vilnius County
- Municipality: Vilnius city municipality

Area
  - Total: 5.7 km^{2} (2.2 sq mi)

Population (2021)
  - Total: 43,453
  - Density: 7,600/km^{2} (20,000/sq mi)
- Time zone: UTC+2 (EET)
  - Summer (DST): UTC+3 (EEST)

Žirmūnai (pronounced [ʑɪrˈmuːnɐi]) is the most populous administrative division (elderate) in Vilnius. It is also a neighbourhood in the Lithuanian capital city Vilnius, encompassing the city district of the same name, built in the 1960s.

Žirmūnai's history has been traced to the late 14th century, when a Lithuanian fishing village was founded across the River Neris from Vilnius' Old Town. Several historic sites in Žirmūnai are internationally significant; it is the home of Lithuania's largest Jewish cemetery, as well as the location of mass graves of soldiers belonging to Napoleon's Grande Armée and victims of the NKGB's and MGB's executions after World War II. Tuskulėnai Manor, built in 1825, and the surrounding Peace Park are important historical and cultural attractions in Vilnius.

The area was given the name Žirmūnai during the early 1960s, when it became the site of an award-winning residential construction project; it was the first city district in the Lithuanian SSR to be constructed applying urban planning concepts established in the USSR at the time. The massive Palace of Concerts and Sports and Žalgiris Stadium are other relics of Žirmūnai's Soviet history. Žirmūnai was important to the industrial sector in the USSR; since that time, this function has been replaced or supplanted by newer businesses, including some of Lithuania's leading companies.

Žirmūnai has undergone major renovation and development in the 21st century. Šiaurės miestelis ("North Town") is an area of Žirmūnai that has rapidly evolved into one of the key business and residential districts of the city. This quarter was used by a number of regimes as a military garrison, and internationally significant historical findings have been made in the area.

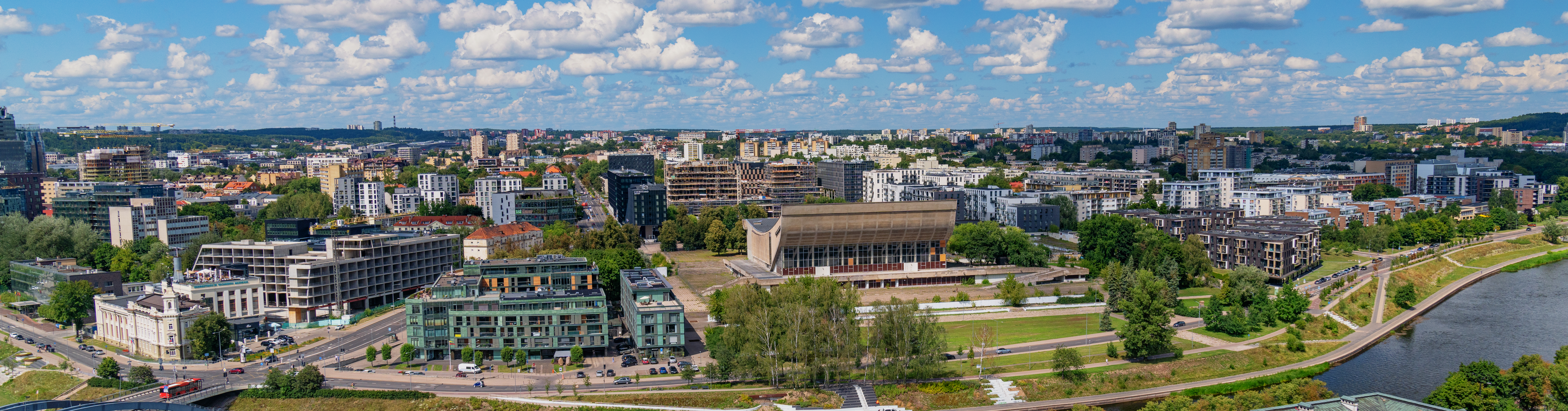
Panoramic view from the Gediminas Tower sky lift.

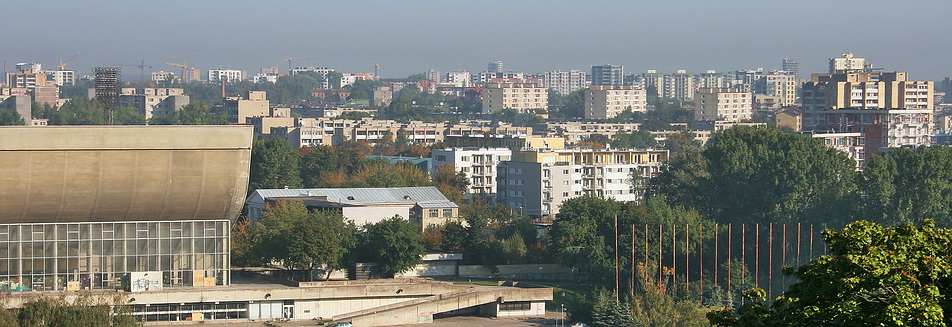
Panoramic view of Žirmūnai from the south

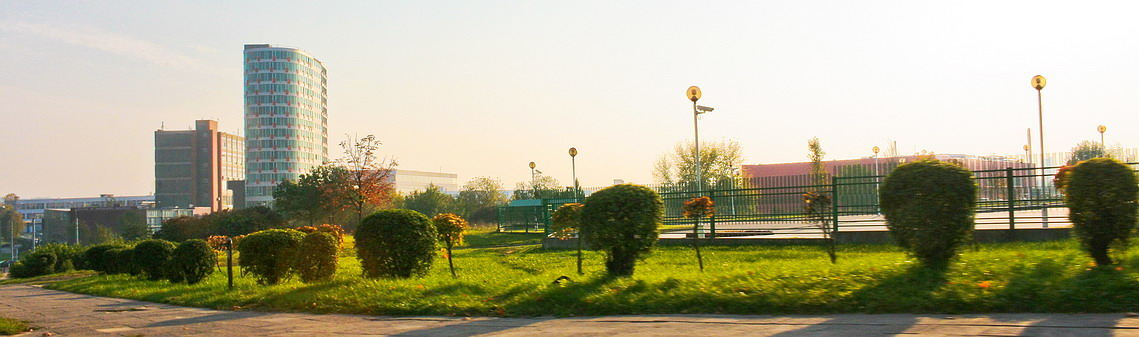
New offices and apartments in Žirmūnai

== Geography ==
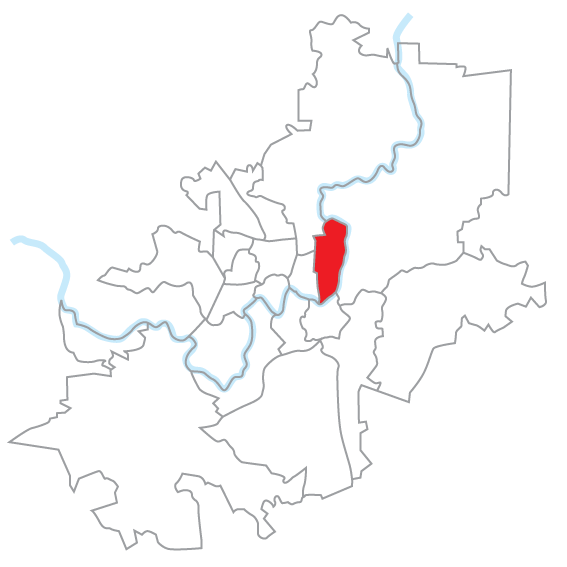
Žirmūnai within the context of the municipality of Vilnius

The Žirmūnai elderate occupies 5.7 km^{2} or 1.4% of the total area of the municipality of Vilnius according to data used for the 2001 census. Žirmūnai is located north of central Vilnius, along the western bank of the River Neris, on a flat plain which rises to the north. The elderate extends for about 4.4 kilometres from north to south, and is about 1.5 kilometres across at its widest point. The southernmost point of the Žirmūnai elderate is only some 450 metres from Vilnius' Cathedral Square, in the centre of the city. Žirmūnai is bordered by the elderates of Verkiai in the north and Šnipiškės in the west, and is separated from Vilnius' Old Town and Antakalnis by the Neris. Žirmūnai's western boundary is defined by the following streets (from north to south): Verkių, Žvalgų, Kalvarijų, Žalgirio, and Rinktinės. The River Neris serves as Žirmūnai's northern, eastern and southern boundary. Žirmūnų Street is the district's main artery.

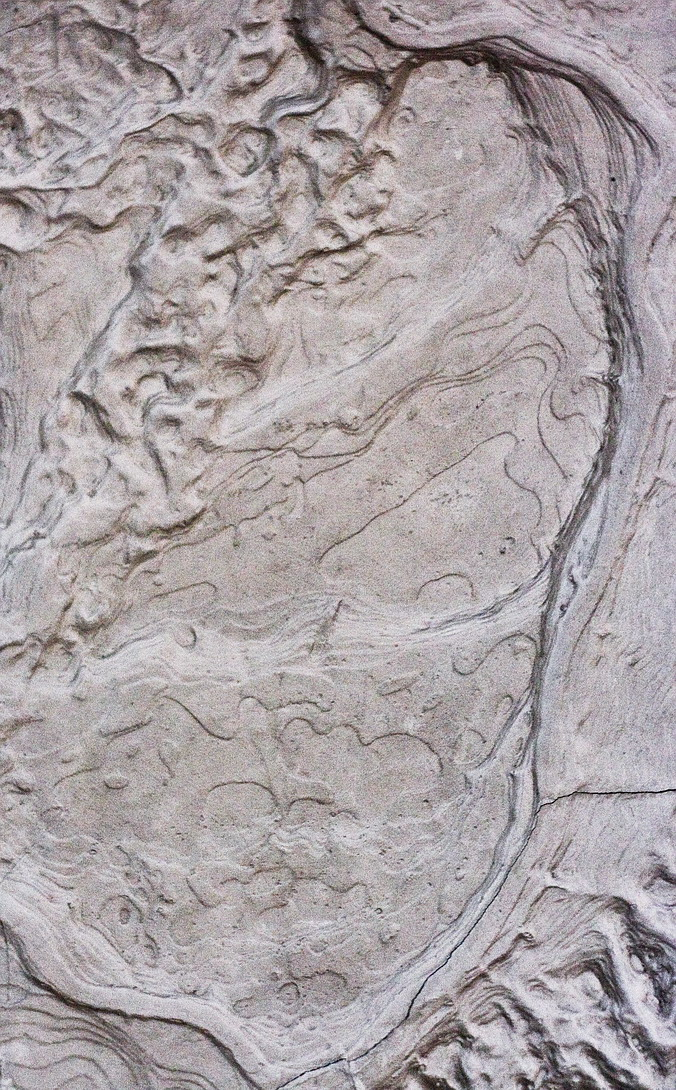
Žirmūnai is among the flattest districts of Vilnius

Despite the proximity of the city centre, the Žirmūnai bank of the River Neris is covered with a strip of dense deciduous forest that begins at the Žirmūnai Bridge and continues upstream (northeasterly). The forested strip is largely uninterrupted, with gaps near bridges. At the approximate centrepoint of the Žirmūnai shoreline, the forest surrounds a backwater, which had been used to park disused passenger ferries. The forest's northernmost section is part of a botanical nature reserve within Verkiai Regional Park.

The Žirmūnai bank of the River Neris, from a point near Žirmūnai Bridge and continuing downstream, was stabilised during the 1980s with a steeply-sloped concrete net-like structure which includes patches of grass between the "webbing" of the net; the lower part of the fortification is a concrete tiled walkway, ending just over 4 kilometres downstream, beyond Liubartas Bridge in Žvėrynas. The walkway is used extensively by walkers, joggers, and cyclists, as well as providing seating for anglers. Construction vehicles sometimes use it to reach work areas. The walkway is submerged during the river floods, mostly in springtime.

== Demographics ==
=== Ethnicity ===
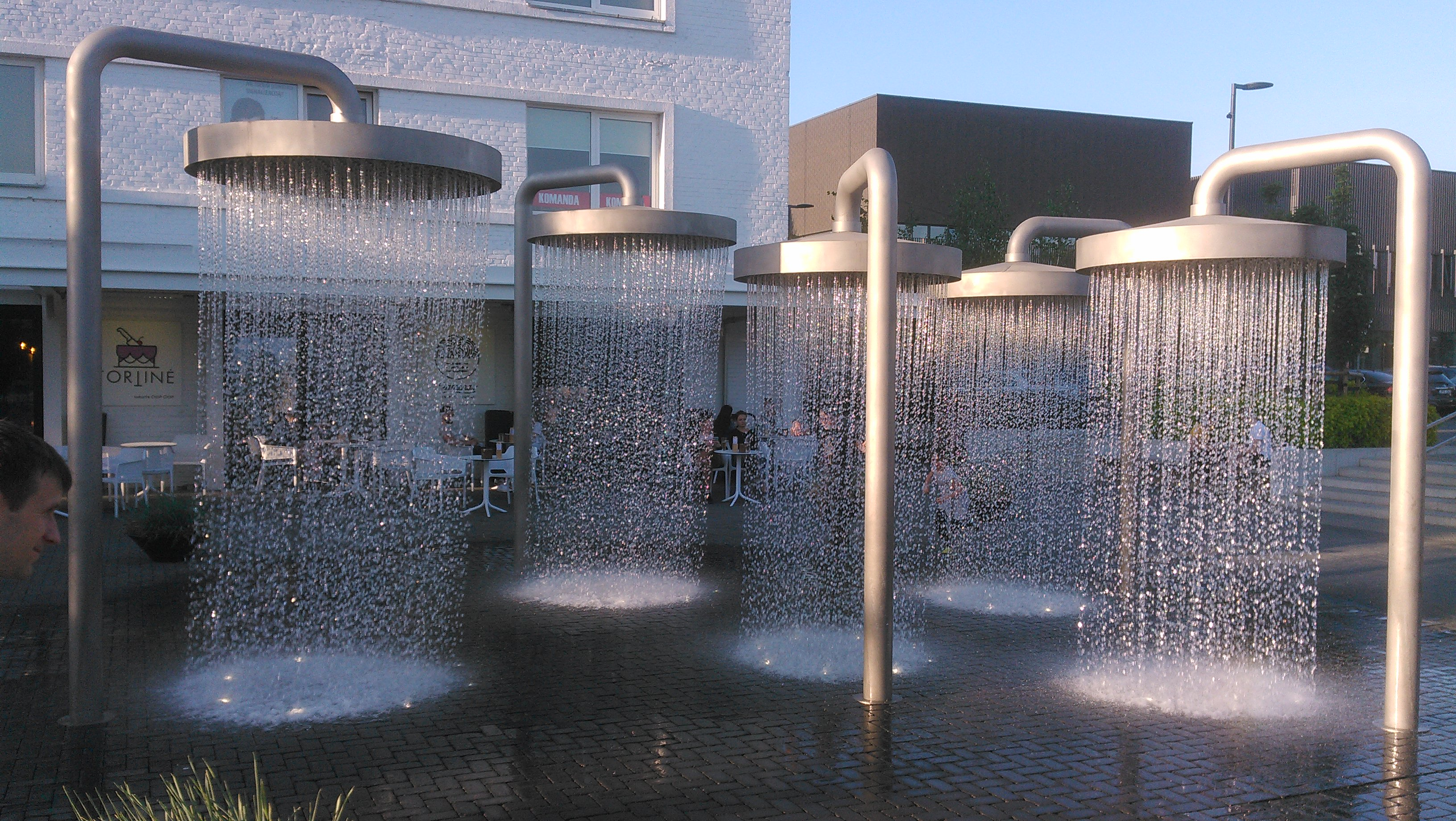
Fountain Family Shower in Šiaurės miestelis

As of the census taken in April 2001, the ethnic makeup of Žirmūnai was 59.2% Lithuanian, 16.8% Russian (the third highest percentage among Vilnius' elderates, behind Naujoji Vilnia and Naujininkai), 14.4% Poles, 3.8% Belarusian, 1.7% Ukrainian, 0.8% Jewish, 0.2% Tatar, 0.1% Latvian, 0.1% Armenian, and 2.9% other or unspecified ethnicity.

=== Population ===
According to the 2001 census, Žirmūnai was the most populous elderate in Vilnius (47,410 residents, comprising 8.7% of Vilnius' total population) and the third most populous in Lithuania after Šilainiai and Dainava, Kaunas. The population density was 8,317.5/km^{2}. According to the census, there were 21,363 private households in the Žirmūnai elderate, making for an average household size of about 2.2 persons. The population of Žirmūnai has been rapidly increasing, largely due to construction of residential buildings in the Šiaurės miestelis section of the elderate. A former elder of Žirmūnai estimated its 2002 population to be about 60,000 residents – an increase of about 13,000 over the 2001 census figure. This rapid growth has placed a strain on city services.

=== Age cohorts ===
Žirmūnai is occasionally described as a "borough of elderly people" or even a "borough of elderly women". There is a certain statistical basis to the claim: according to the data of the April 2001 census, only about 43.5% of Žirmūnai's population were male, the second lowest percentage in Vilnius, after Žvėrynas (43.1%); 27.4% of the population (33.2% of women and 19.9% of men) were of legal retirement age, which was 57.5 years for women and 61.5 years for men at the time. This is the highest percentage in Vilnius; accordingly, Žirmūnai had the lowest percentage of residents that were statistically of working age (defined as over age 15 and up to the retirement age) in Vilnius, only 56.4% in total: 52.8% of women and 61.1% of men.

The heavy proportion of elderly persons in the district may be attributed to the settled way of life of those residents who arrived during the building boom of the 1960s: the children of these residents moved elsewhere to live, leaving their parents in the old dwelling. The skewed male–female ratio is probably an artifact of the differential between male and female lifespans in Lithuania (male average lifespan in Lithuania was 66 years in 2004, as against 78 for females), according to the World Health Organization.

At the time of the 2001 census, persons aged between 0 and 15 years comprised 16.1% of Žirmūnai's population, the second lowest percentage among Vilnius' elderates, slightly higher than Viršuliškės at 15.5%. However, it is likely that the average age of Žirmūnai's residents has decreased since the last census, and will continue to decrease, as a result of the active construction of new dwellings, which are acquired primarily by younger people. As housing prices rise, retirees are motivated to sell their apartments with the goal of acquiring cheaper housing elsewhere with funds to spare.

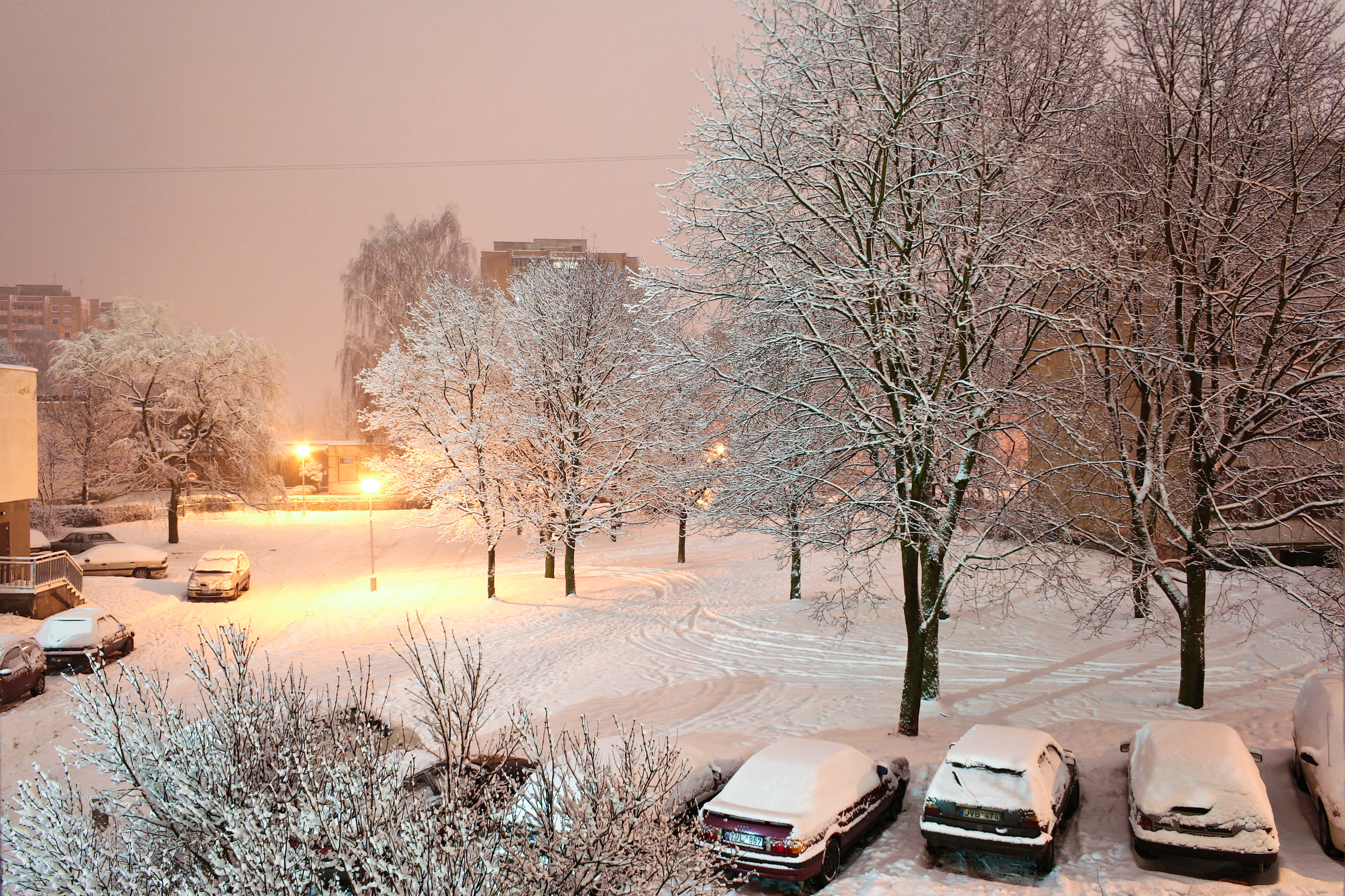
Residential quarter at night in winter

=== Crime statistics ===
In 2005, 2,317 crimes were registered in the Žirmūnai elderate. This is the third highest figure among Vilnius' elderates, behind the Old Town and Naujamiestis. Using the population data of the latest available census (2001), this would amount to about 48.9 crimes per 1,000 residents per year (only the eighth highest figure, due to the elderate's large population; Vilnius' total crime rate, using the same population data, would be about 51 crimes per 1,000 residents). In terms of crime density, 406.5 crimes per 1 square kilometre were registered (the fourth highest figure, behind the Old Town, Naujamiestis and Šnipiškės; Vilnius' total crime density, using the same population data, would be about 70.4).

However, thanks largely to the crime prevention programme Saugus miestas ("Safe City"), crime rates in Žirmūnai, as in all other elderates of Vilnius, are declining. For instance, 886 crimes were registered in Žirmūnai during the first four months of 2005, versus 672 during the same period of 2006, a decline of about 24%. If this trend continues, Žirmūnai's crime rate for 2006 would decrease to about 37.2 crimes per 1,000 residents.

The most frequently registered crimes during the first four months of 2006 were: theft (335 instances, including 19 car thefts, constituting about 50% of the total number of crimes); rape (259 instances or about 38.5% of the total); robbery (44 instances or about 6.5%); and bodily injury (20 instances or about 3%). Percentage data may overlap as one criminal act may have several features, which are registered separately, but the total number of crimes is calculated per incident.

== History ==
The elderate of Žirmūnai embraces three historical suburbs of Vilnius: Žvejai, Tuskulėnai and Šiaurės miestelis. Fishing village Žvejai dating to the 14th century included the only glass factory in the 16th century Lithuania, as well as the largest Jewish cemetery. It became an integral part of Vilnius in the 16th century. The area south of Žvejai became known after the name of the Tusculanum Manor. Manor itself was a property of noble families and officials, and is the oldest building in Žirmūnai. In the 19th century, a military garrison was established in the present-day Šiaurės miestelis, which was used by Russian, French and Polish armies. These territories were consolidated into Vilnius city during the period of rapid growth that occurred in the 1950s and 1960s. The Tuskulėnai Manor was used as the KGB officers' apartments back then. In the last years, a housing renovation program was launched in Žirmūnai. Military structures in Šiaurės miestelis of a historical value have been preserved and restored. Šiaurės miestelis became one of the most sought–after residential and commercial areas of Vilnius.

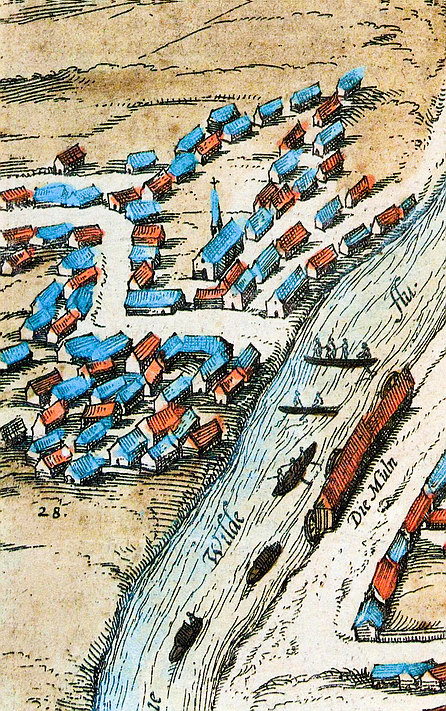
Right bank of Neris River in Vilnius (1581)

=== 14th–19th centuries ===
Žirmūnai's southernmost section, which lies on the bank of the River Neris opposite the Vilnius Castle Complex, was part of the settlement known as Žvejai; another part of that settlement is now located within the elderate of Šnipiškės. According to archaeological surveys from 2005, a fishing village may have been located here as early as the late 14th century, giving the area its name, literally, Fishermen; it was later settled by craftsmen and housed the Orthodox Church of St Barbara. During the 16th century, the only glass factory in the Grand Duchy of Lithuania was located in the suburb of Žvejai. In 1563, after the construction of the first bridge over the River Neris (at the approximate location of today's Mindaugas Bridge), the suburb of Žvejai became an integral part of the city of Vilnius. During Tsarist rule in the 19th century, the name of Žvejai was superseded by that of Piramont, originating from the small estate of Piramont in the area (now Kalvarijų 1). Piramontskij Alley can be seen in a 1904 map of Vilnius where today's A. Juozapavičiaus Street in the elderate of Šnipiškės is located, close to the boundary of Žirmūnai. The usage of Piramont as a placename gradually became limited to the southern part of Žvejai.

The heritage of Žvejai was retained in the name of Žvejų ("Fishermen's") Street, which runs alongside the River Neris in southern Šnipiškės and Žirmūnai. However, the Žirmūnai section of this street was renamed Olimpiečių ("Olympians") in 2000 to commemorate the achievements of Lithuanian Olympic athletes in the Sydney Olympics.

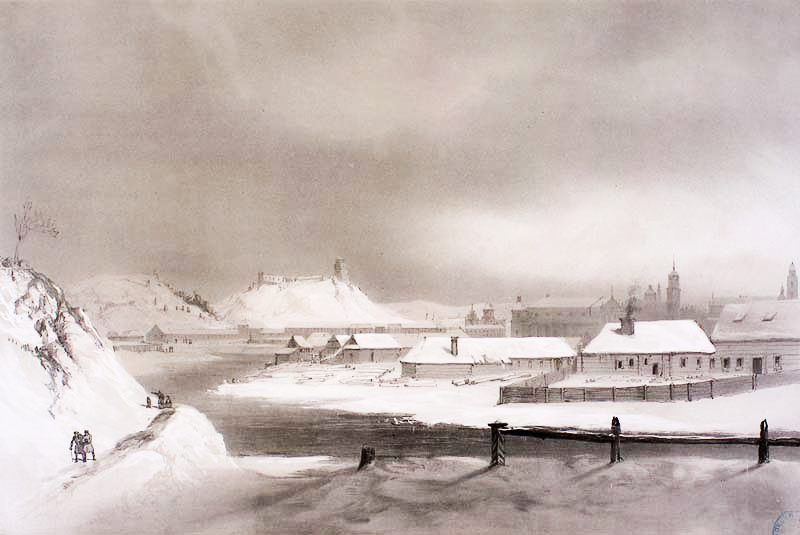
Žvejai in the early 19th century, by Franciszek Smuglewicz

The largest and oldest Jewish cemetery in Lithuania, first mentioned in 1592, was also located in Žvejai. It was known in the local Jewish community as Shnipishok. The Yiddish placename later became associated with the whole borough of Šnipiškės, now bordering Žirmūnai on the west. Although the cemetery was officially closed in 1830 and was subject to gradual deterioration, there were further interments. Vilna Gaon, as well as other famous Vilnian Jews, were interred in the cemetery.

During the years of the Polish–Lithuanian Commonwealth, in the area on the right bank of the River Neris opposite the St. Peter and St. Paul's Church in Antakalnis, a Royal Manor called Derevnictva (Polish: Derewnictwo), was established in the mid-16th century by King Sigismund Augustus as an outpost of the Vilnius Castles. The manor was held by the kings Sigismund III Vasa and Władysław IV Vasa, nobleman M. Piegłowski, the Wołowicz family, the Grand Hetman of Lithuania Michał Kazimierz Pac, as well by the Tyzenhaus family after 1741. In the mid-18th century, Lateran monks acquired the manor and named it Tusculanum, after the resort outside the ancient Roman city of Tusculum. (see also: Villa Rufinella) The surrounding forests were used as a game reserve and for sport fishing. Towards the end of the century, the manor was separated into the folwarks of Tuskulėnai, based on the core of the old royal manor, and Derevnictva.

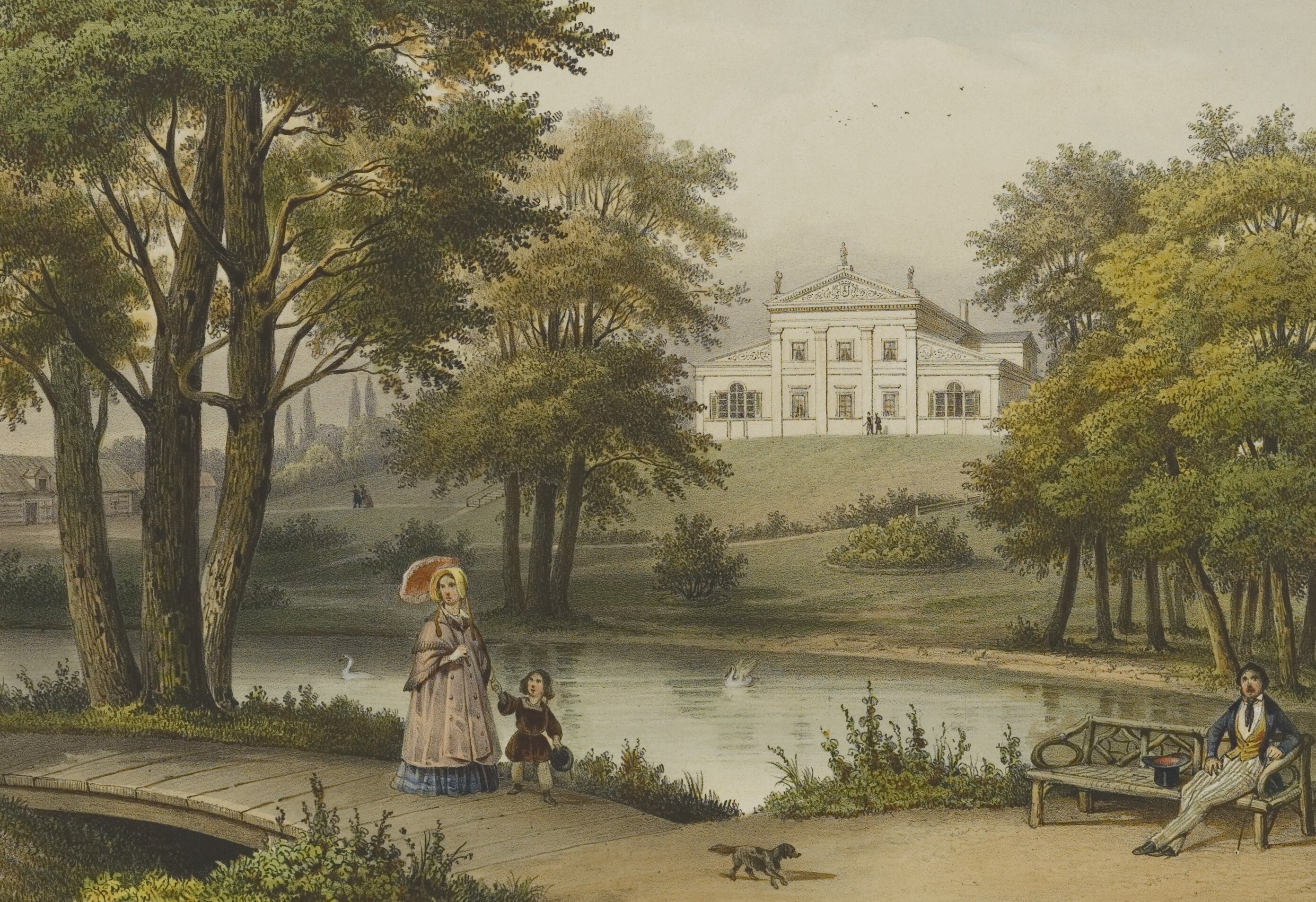
Painting of the Tuskulėnai Manor in 1848

Under the rule of the Russian Empire in the 19th century, the Tuskulėnai Manor was held by various noble families and high-ranking state officials, including Governor General of Lithuanian–Vilna Governorate, Alexander Rimsky-Korsakov. In the mid-19th century the main palace was transformed into a guesthouse that became a cultural center in Vilnius, often visited by Stanislaw Moniuszko and Józef Ignacy Kraszewski. The manor passed into the possession of Julija Safranovich after 1886, and then was held by Olga Melentjeva and her noble family until World War II.

The area surrounding Tuskulėnai Manor was referred to as Tuskulėnai (Russian: Tuskuljany; Polish: Tuskulanum) until World War II. This area was also known as Losiovka or Losiuvka, colloquially named after A. Losev, colonel of Special Corps of Gendarmes and later general of the Russian Empire, who owned the folwark of Tuskulėnai in 1869. The placenames are associated primarily with individual wooden houses, built in the late 19th and early 20th centuries, some of which are still scattered among the apartment buildings.

A military garrison was built in the approximate location of the modern Šiaurės miestelis ("North Town", that is, north of Old Vilnius) section of Žirmūnai by the Russian Empire during the 19th century. This area went on to be used as a garrison by a number of armies: Napoleon's Grande Armée in 1812, Tsarist for the rest of the 19th century and in the beginning of the 20th century (see: the 27th infantry division's camp in the map of 1904), the Bolsheviks during World War I, the Polish army in the inter-war period, and the Red Army from the 1950s to 1992.

=== 20th century ===
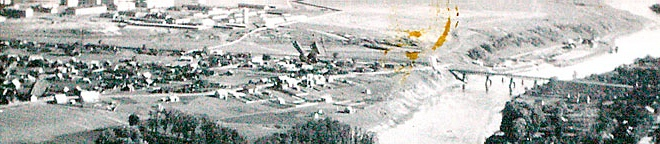
Central part of Žirmūnai in the early 20th century. Losiovka below and military garrison above. Railway bridge on the left side

During the interwar period, when Vilnius was under Polish control, the southern part of Žvejai was known as Pióromont; the entire Žvejai area was referred to as Rybaki (Polish for "Fishermen"); modern Šiaurės miestelis had been called Plac broni (Polish for the "Military training ground"); and the old placename of Derewnictwo, dating back to the times of the Polish–Lithuanian Commonwealth, applied to the area north of Tuskulėnai Manor.

A map of Vilnius published in 1942, while the city was under Nazi rule, shows the northern part of Žirmūnai as Paneriškės, the middle section as Kareiviškės ("place of soldiers") and the southern part, close to the Tuskulėnai Manor, as Mantiškės ("a place named in honour of Mantas"). One of the streets in the area, Enriko Manto Street, referred to Herkus Mantas (Herkus Monte), a hero of the Great Prussian Uprising; today H. Manto Street is a short street in the Šnipiškės elderate ending at the boundary of Žirmūnai.

A Soviet military base was established in the current Šiaurės miestelis section of Žirmūnai during the 1950s. The heavily wooded northernmost part of the elderate was thinly populated until the 1960s.

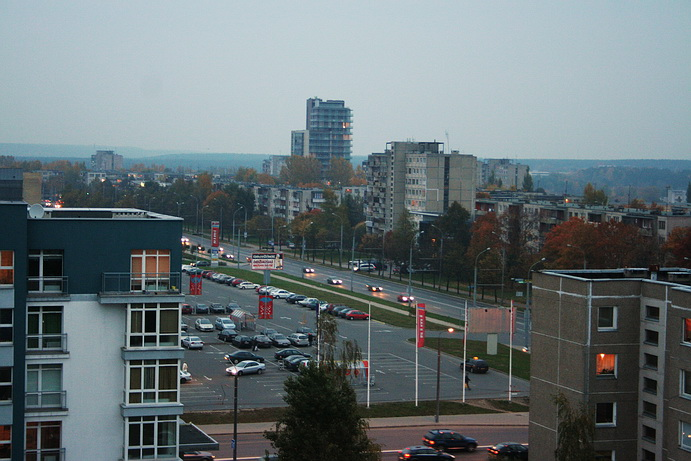
A view of central Žirmūnai in the evening (2006)

During the 1960s, Žirmūnai attracted the attention of urban planners; it became the first city district in the Lithuanian SSR to be constructed applying urban planning concepts established in the USSR at that time. Designed in 1962, the district consisted of three microdistricts – residential and industrial sections centred around public facilities and had been the largest residential area in the city.

The first microdistrict, or "Žirmūnai I", which is district's middle section, was built in 1962–67 in accordance with a project by architect Birutė Kasperavičienė, who was awarded the USSR State Prize in 1968, together with architect Bronislovas Krūminis and engineers Ṧmuelis Liubeckis and Vaclovas Zubras; it was the first time this award had been presented to the designers of a large-scale residential construction. The second microdistrict, "Žirmūnai II", which is the southernmost of the three, was built in 1964–68, its architect being Nijolė Chlomauskienė. And the third, the northernmost microdistrict, "Žirmūnai III" designed by architect Laima Burneikienė was built in 1964–69 in the site of the former village of Paneriškės. The city district was then named after the formerly Lithuanian village of Žirmūnai (Zhirmuny), now situated 16 kilometres from the Lithuania–Belarus border in the Voranauski District, Hrodna province of Belarus. This village is where Karol Podczaszyński, an architect and designer of Tuskulėnai Manor, was born. Hence the future district's major street Žirmūnų was named after the village as it is seen in the map of 1942 and gave its name to the entire district.

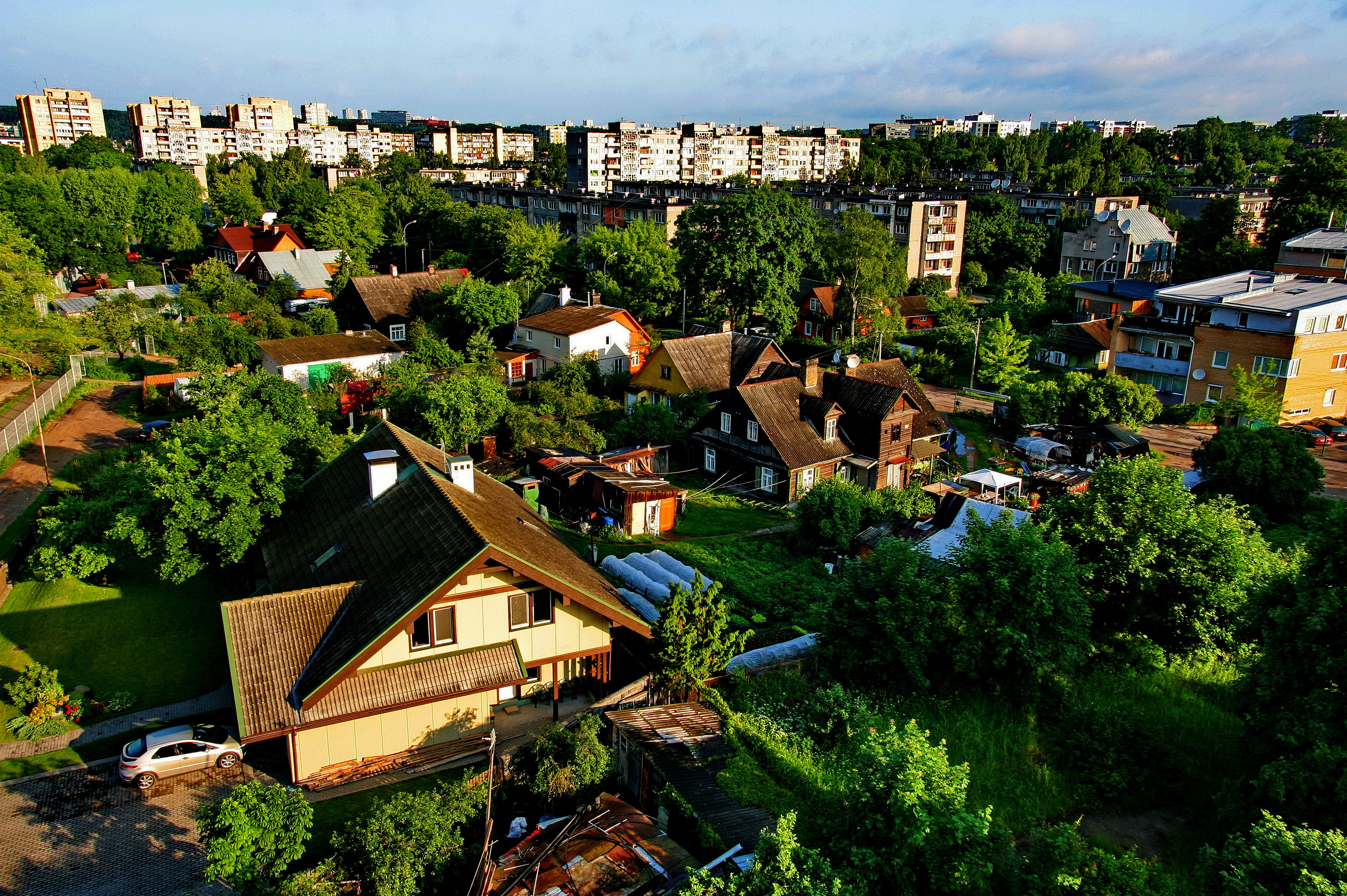
View of remaining Losiovka at present (2009)

The new residential housing in the microdistrict consisted almost exclusively of five-story prefabricated concrete block apartment buildings popularly known as khrushchyovkas. Three nine-story high-rise apartment buildings were built in 1969, and several more were constructed later, as well as seven brick-built twelve-storeys. The apartment buildings were meant primarily to accommodate industrial workers who came to Vilnius from other regions of the Lithuanian SSR and from other Soviet Republics. They typify the Brutalist architecture of the era. The principles governing the design of the microdistrict were set forth in books by the University of Moscow planners, for instance in New Element of Populating. En Route to the New City published in the USSR in 1966 (although the concept of the "new element" has been dated to 1959); the book was later published as The Ideal Communist City in the United States, United Kingdom and Italy. According to the book, the optimal apartment size was about 600 square feet (56 square metres), with one bathroom and two bedrooms. Single-family homes were considered "too autonomous".

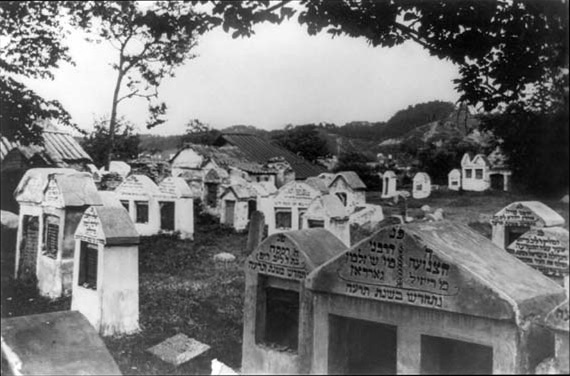
Jewish cemetery in 1922

The ancient Jewish cemetery in Žvejai stood in the way of the expansion. Many tombstones were destroyed in 1950 during the construction of Žalgiris Stadium; the cemetery was completely demolished in 1955 in accordance with a decree issued by local authorities in 1948. The bodies of Vilna Gaon and several members of his immediate family were relocated, after receiving special permission from the Soviet authorities; this relocation has been the subject of historical controversy. The cemetery was the subject of an archaeological survey in the late 1990s. A memorial stone was placed in the southeastern portion of the former cemetery with an inscription in Yiddish and Lithuanian, stating that the cemetery was established there in 1478 (this dating is disputed).

An incident in Žirmūnai's history that has been difficult to reconstruct occurred in 1975, when a pontoon bridge across the River Neris, that was customarily set up from spring to autumn, collapsed due to the weight of a crowd returning from a concert in the Palace of Concerts and Sports. It was rumoured that the bridge supports were not fully connected at the time. There were witnessed fatalities involving drownings and crushing by the bridge structures. Public discussion of the disaster was restricted and the number of casualties remains unknown. The pontoon bridge was never re-erected at the site; the Mindaugas Bridge now serves this need.

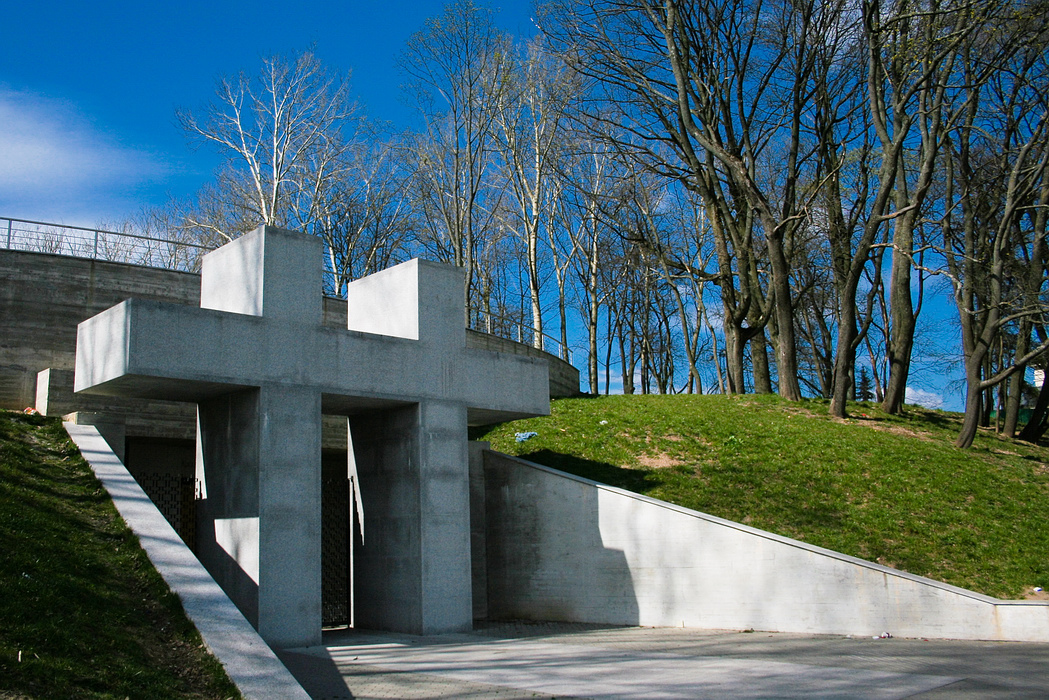
An entrance to a columbarium, containing the remains of victims

Tuskulėnai Manor had been nationalised in 1940 and was later used as KGB officers' apartments and as a kindergarten. During excavations that took place between 1994 and 1996 in its territory, the remains of 706 bodies were found; 40 were identified. The area had been used to hide the bodies of Lithuanian residents – mostly resistance fighters against the Soviet occupation and Nazi collaborators – who had been executed by the NKGB and MGB in the Vilnius' KGB Palace between 1944 and 1947 but also those who died fighting Polish Armia Krajowa soldiers. The remains from the mass grave were placed in a columbarium built underground, beneath an artificial hill, and consecrated in 2004.

In 2001, workers laying telephone line in Šiaurės miestelis, near the former garrison, discovered a mass grave that was found to contain the bodies of about 2,000 soldiers – the remnants of Napoleon's Grande Armée as it retreated from Moscow. In December 1812, temperatures in Vilnius had sunk to −30 °C, and the frozen ground made proper burials impossible. The Grande Armée at that time comprised French, Portuguese, Italians, Germans, Austrians, Spaniards, and Croats, as well as Lithuanians and Poles. The bones have been intensively studied by forensic pathologists; DNA evidence showed that many of the deaths were caused by typhus. Most of the remains were re-interred in Antakalnis Cemetery. Other findings included buttons stamped with Napoleon's image, crucifixes, wedding rings, belt buckles, boots and pieces of French uniforms. Footage from the location has been used in the TV series Moments in Time produced by Discovery Channel and Meet the Ancestors by BBC. The archaeological surveys were partially sponsored by the producers.

The Red Army military base in Žirmūnai was abandoned in 1992, a few years after Lithuania's independence from the Soviet Union; a grace period was granted in order to ensure the orderly resettlement of the soldiers and their families.

=== 21st century ===
Due to the Soviet principles of urban planning, Žirmūnai, according to the 2001 census data, was among the three Vilnius elderates (the other two being Karoliniškės and Viršuliškės) with the lowest percentage of single-family housing in the city (0.1%). Of the remaining residents, 0.4% owned a share of individual housing, 0.7% lived in hostels, and almost 99% lived in apartments. The scarcity of lots means that the number of single-family dwellings is not likely to increase; a reverse process is taking place: old wooden houses are being demolished, making room for new residential and commercial constructions. As of 2007, there were only a few modern single-family houses in Žirmūnai.

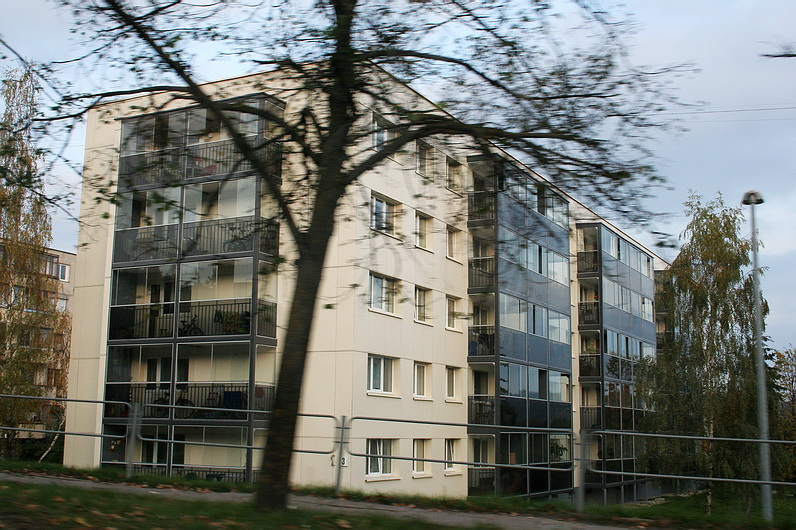
The first renovated apartment building (1965) in Žirmūnai

Žirmūnai's housing, especially in its central sections, is in need of extensive renovation, due to wear and tear of its low or medium-quality construction. A program to renew old apartment buildings (including the installation of better insulation) is ongoing in Vilnius, partially assisted by the Vilnius City Municipality; the first finished renovation project – a completely renewed 60-apartment building built in 1965 – is located in Žirmūnai. The area is, in some ways, analogous to public housing districts in Chicago and London; although much of the housing was quickly and inexpensively erected in the 1960s, its proximity to downtown Vilnius, its transportation infrastructure, and its access to the River Neris account for its popularity. The principles of Soviet urban planning that led to its growth have converged with the modern concept of "Smart growth".

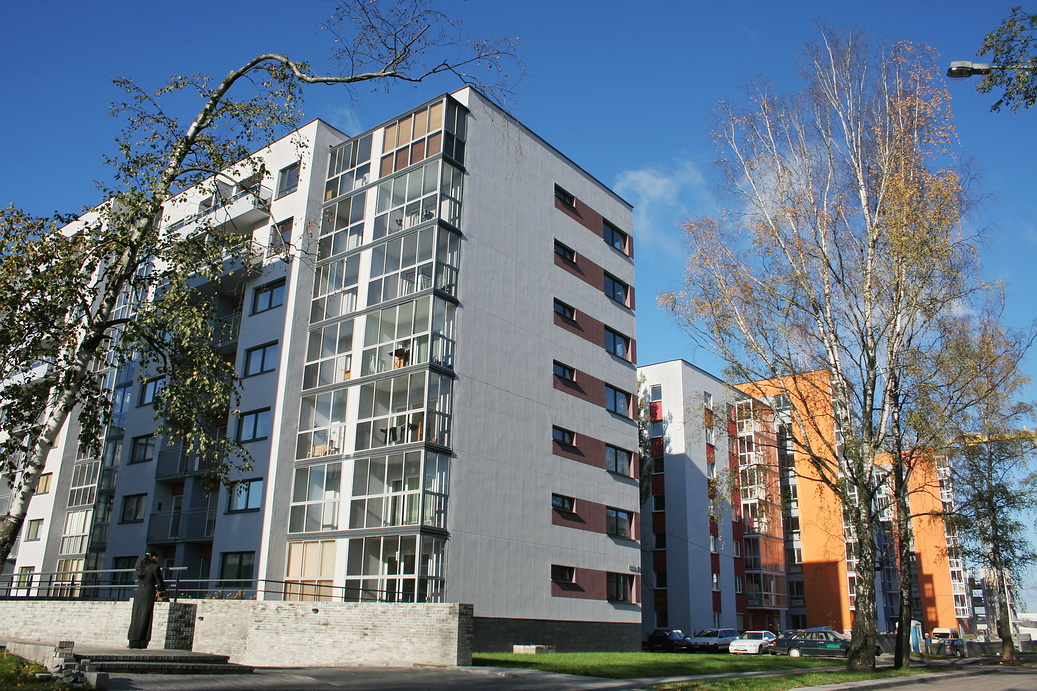
Residential construction in Šiaurės miestelis

The Šiaurės miestelis section of Žirmūnai is growing rapidly and in 2007 was one of Vilnius' most sought-after residential and commercial areas.

Many of the military structures that were built in the late 19th century in Šiaurės miestelis have been preserved and restored. Meanwhile, much of the construction that was not deemed to be of permanent value, erected during the Soviet times, has been demolished, leaving room for new streets and housing. The combination of military heritage sites and newer construction is a distinctive feature of Šiaurės miestelis.

Reflecting its military history, numerous street names in and around Šiaurės miestelis allude to military concepts, including Kareivių ("Soldiers"), Lakūnų ("Pilots"), Žygio ("March"), Apkasų ("Trenches"), Ulonų ("Light Cavalry"). The new streets built in Šiaurės miestelis during the beginning of the 21st century were named for prominent figures in Lithuanian military history: Povilas Lukšys, Lithuanian army volunteer, the first to perish in the Independence Wars in 1919 with the Bolshevik forces, as well as Kazys Ladyga, Silvestras Žukauskas, Jonas Galvydis-Bikauskas, Vladas Nagevičius, and Jurgis Kubilius, prominent officers of the inter-war Lithuanian Army, whose histories are not directly related to the area. On the contrary, these personalities distinguished themselves by opposing the Bolshevik and Polish armies that were historically garrisoned in Šiaurės miestelis. The naming was suggested by the Ministry of Defence. There are more streets not far from Šiaurės miestelis that bear military-themed names: Raitininkų ("Cavalrymen"), Žvalgų ("Scouts") and Rinktinės ("Platoon").

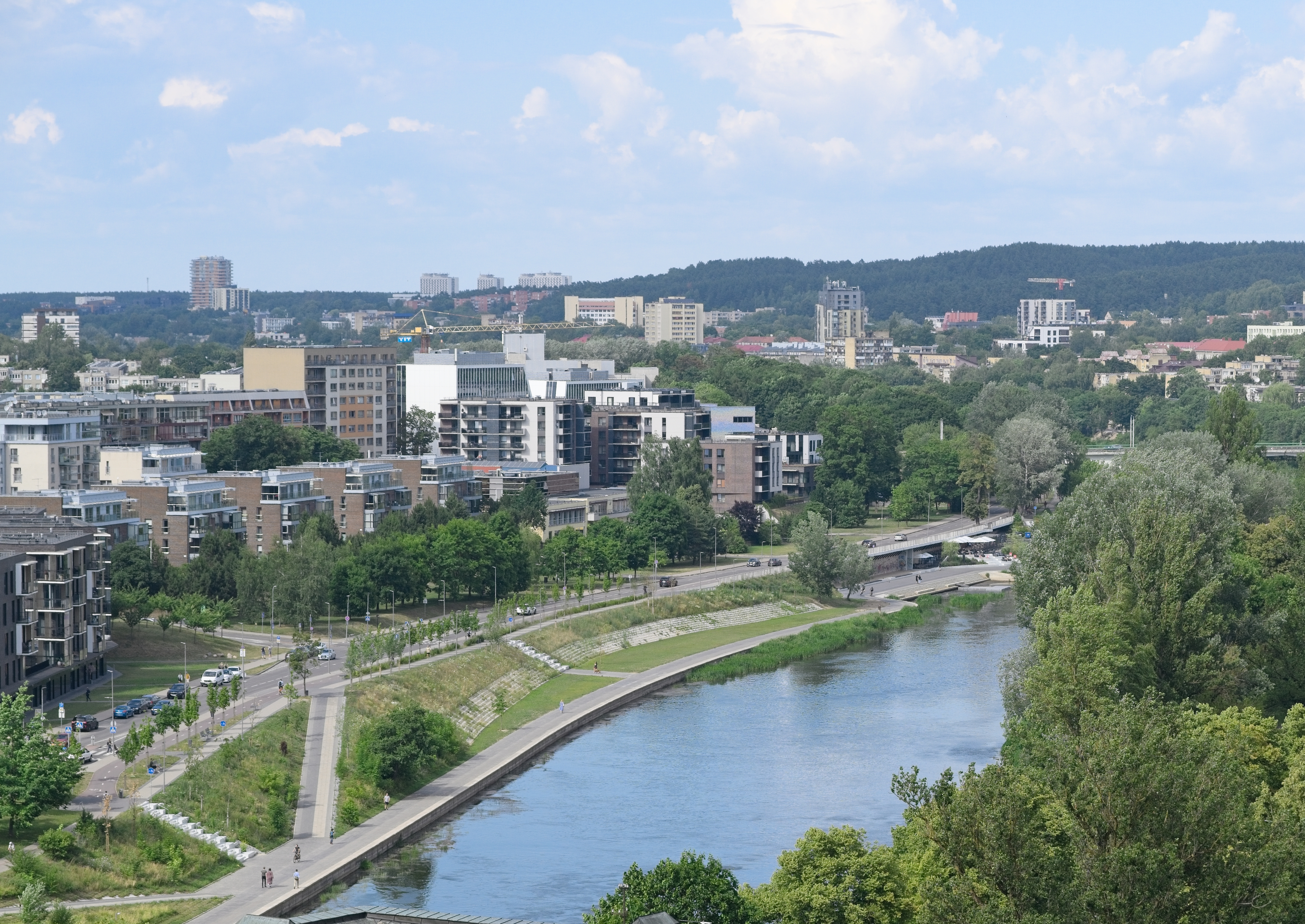
Residences along the Neris river

An international dispute arose in the 2000s over construction near the Jewish cemetery, with organizations expressing concerns that gravesites could be disturbed.

== Education ==
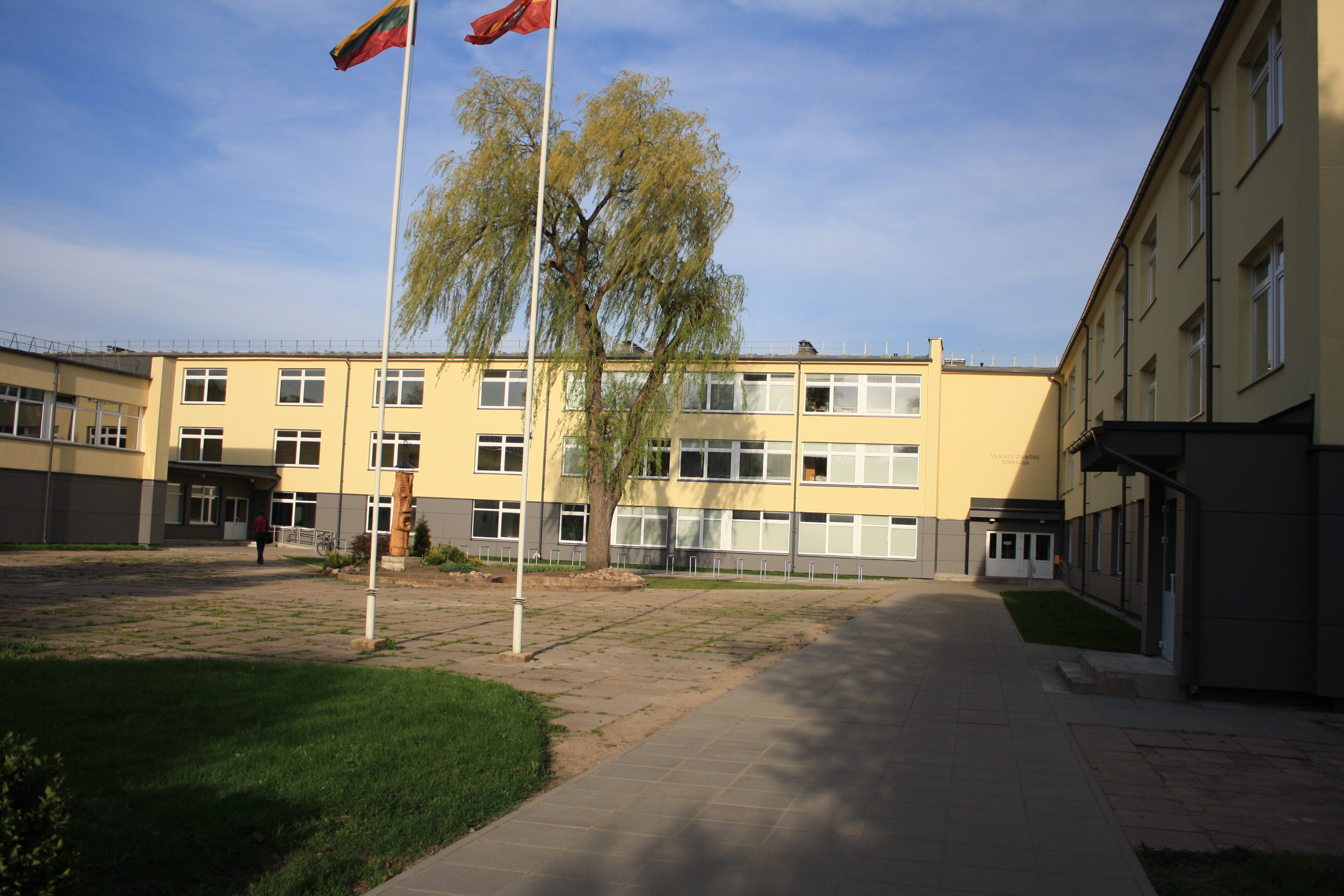
Vilnius Žirmūnai gymnasium

The educational institutions in Žirmūnai include three secondary schools, all Lithuanian-language. Tuskulėnai Secondary School (Lithuanian: Tuskulėnų vidurinė mokykla, formerly Vilnius' Secondary School No. 31) had 1,463 students in 2006, which made it the fifth largest school in Vilnius. The school features advanced classes in the visual arts. St. Christopher's Gymnasium (Lithuanian: Šv. Kristoforo gimnazija, formerly Vilnius' Secondary School No. 9) was the eighth largest in Vilnius with 1,391 students in 2006. Žirmūnai Gymnasium (Lithuanian: Žirmūnų gimnazija, formerly Vilnius Secondary School No. 7) had 800 students in 2006. The school was granted the title Gymnasium in 2000; it is home to the acclaimed brass band Septima, established in 1966.

There are three elementary schools located in Žirmūnai: Antoni Wiwulski, Emilia Plater, and St. Christopher. Šarūnas Marčiulionis Basketball School and Vilnius Sports School offer physical education. The Vilnius School of Radioelectronics and Precision Mechanics (Lithuanian: Vilniaus radioelektronikos ir tiksliosios mechanikos mokykla) was established in 1965 to prepare workers for Vilma, a manufacturer of electrical products still operating in Žirmūnai. The Vilnius School of Tourism and Commerce (Lithuanian: Vilniaus turizmo ir prekybos verslo mokykla) offers certificates in retailing, basic bookkeeping, hotel and restaurant services, and other business areas. Vilnius Gija Youth School serves those students who have special needs and do not succeed in traditional classroom settings. Žirmūnai also has one of the three Children's Foster Homes in Vilnius.

As of the census taken in April 2001, 26.2% of Žirmūnai's residents aged 10 or older possessed a bachelor's or higher degree.

== Facilities ==
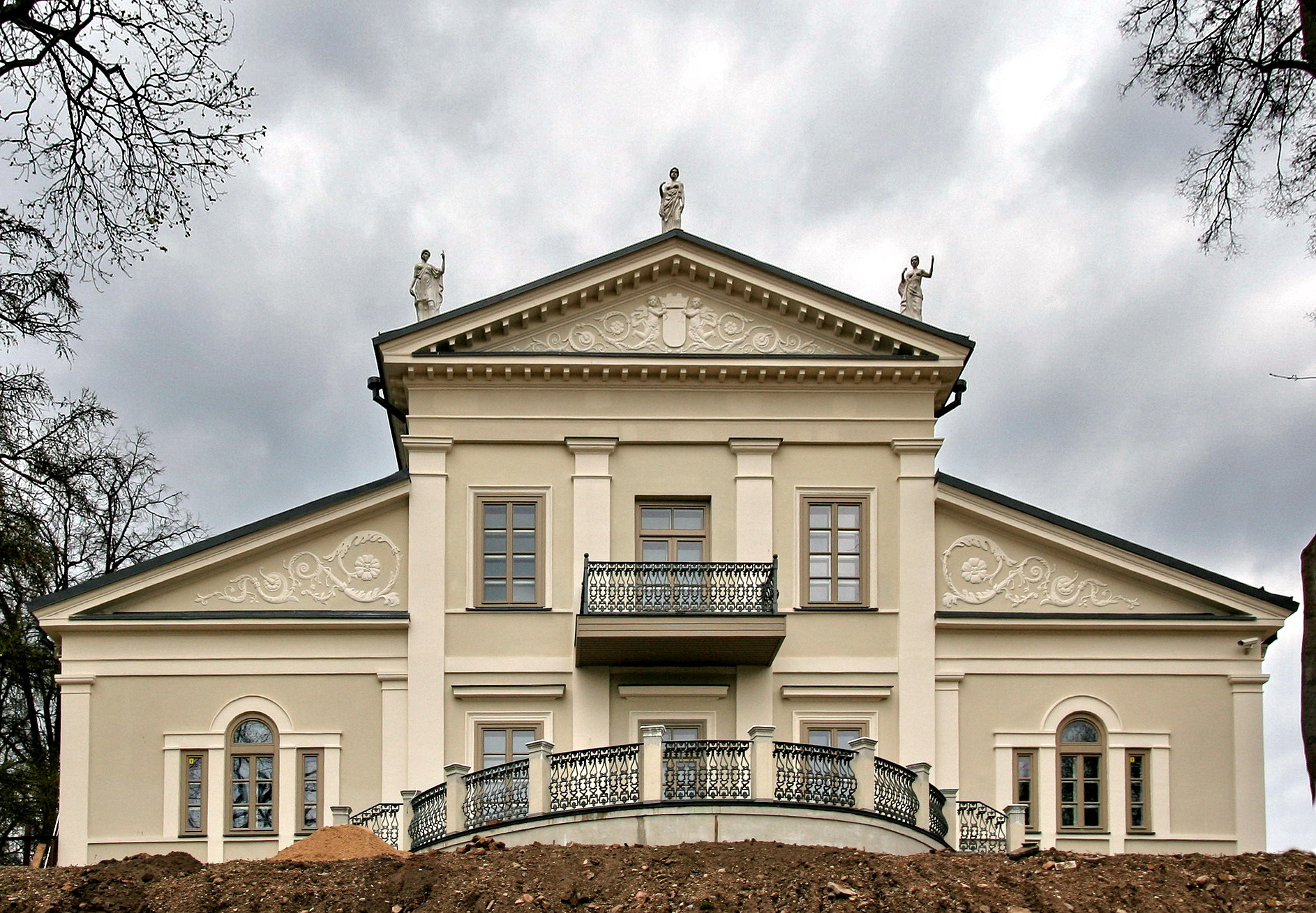
The reconstructed palace

=== Parks and museums ===
Tuskulėnai Manor is Žirmūnai's oldest extant architectural structure. The manor was built in 1825, following a design by Karol Podczaszyński in the neoclassical style. It consists of the principal building (the palace), an officina (storage house), and several adjacent buildings, including a small eclectic chapel of St. Theresa located about 100 metres south of the principal building. The "Little White Manor", also known as the villa of Franciszek Walicki, was built in 1866 further south from the manor, acquired by Walicki in 1928, and reconstructed to serve as a summer residence. All of these structures have been restored by 2009, and are a part of the 7.5-hectare Peace Park (Rimties parkas) that includes the Tuskulėnai Manor, hosting a museum of martyrology in Lithuania in the second half of the 20th century (a branch of the Lithuanian Museum of Genocide Victims), restored landscaping, as well as the columbarium.

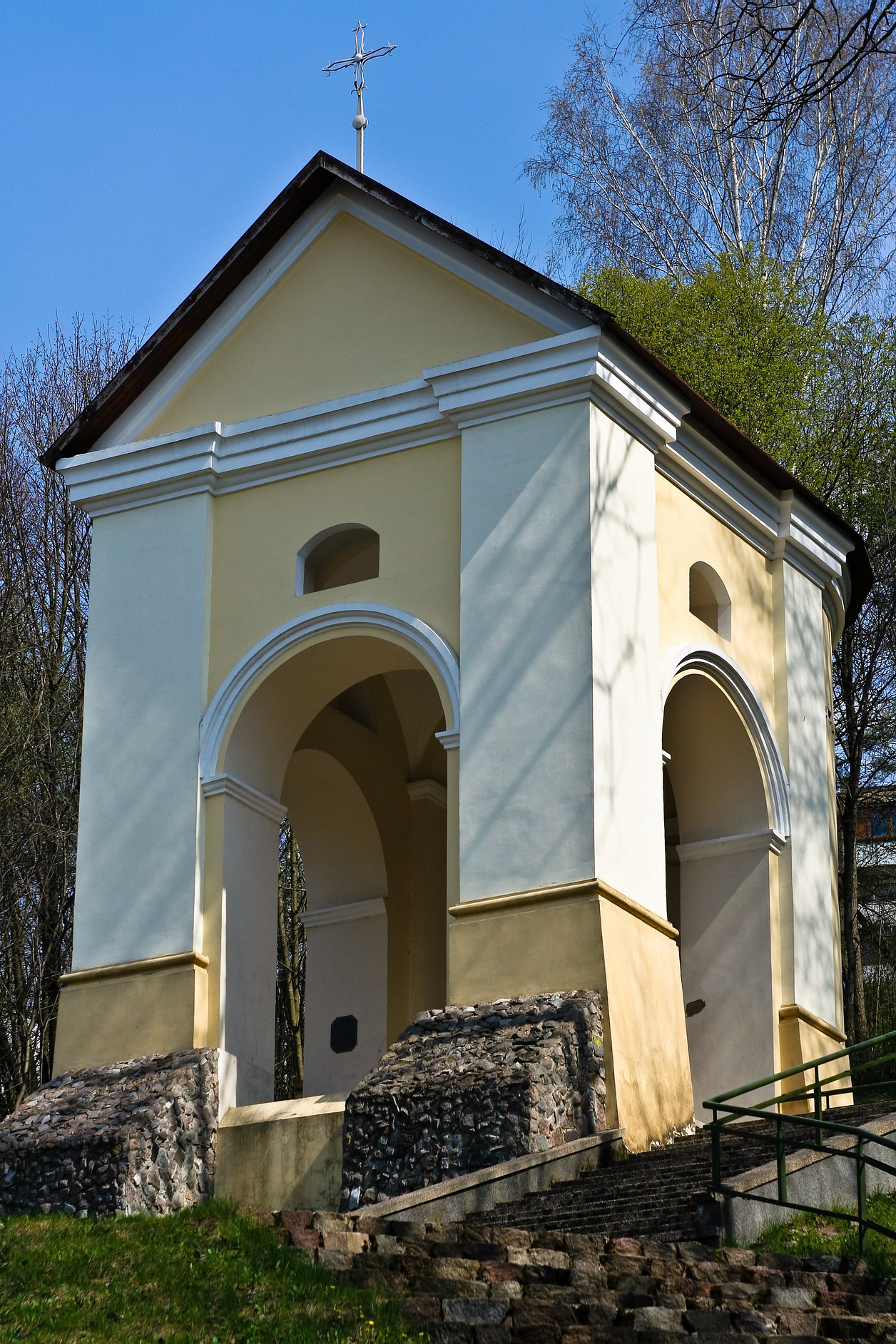
A Calvary chapel

A Museum of Computing was opened in 2001 in Žirmūnai by the Lithuanian software company Sintagma, showcasing the history of Lithuanian computing science and hardware production. It was based on a museum opened in 1985 by Sigma, one of the leading computer manufacturers in the former Soviet Union. The museum's exhibits include EV-80, the first Soviet vacuum tube computing machine manufactured by Sigma, and a copy of the IBM 604.

Three of the 19 brick chapels of the Vilnius Stations of the Cross (Vilniaus Kalvarijos), part of Verkiai Regional Park, are located at the extreme northwestern corner of Žirmūnai, just within the elderate's border. Once destroyed in 1963 and completely rebuilt, the three chapels, symbolizing the Mount of Olives and the Gardens of Gethsemane, are found only 20 meters away from the relatively busy Verkių Street, and about a hundred meters downhill from a group of Soviet multi-storey apartment buildings.

The forested area along the banks of the River Neris in Žirmūnai and its walkways are a popular recreational destination for many Vilnians.

=== Governmental offices ===
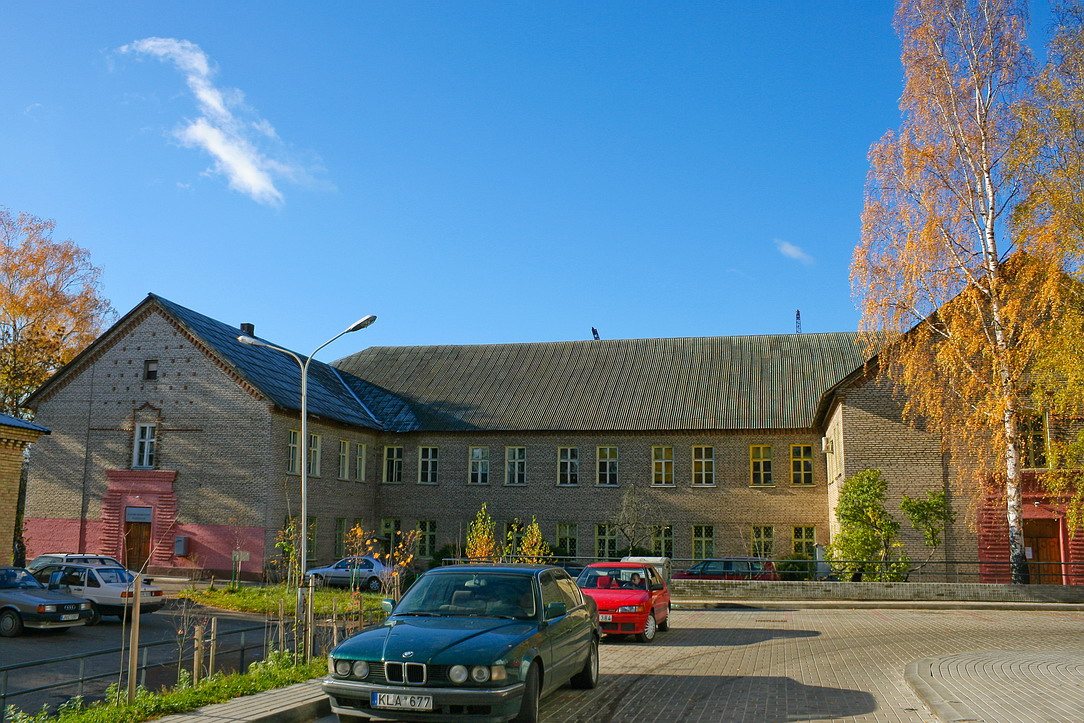
Institute of Forensic Medicine, formerly housed in a military building (2006)

As a primarily residential area, Žirmūnai hosted only 7.4% of Vilnius' public offices in 2003. Žirmūnai is the location of the Personal Identity Documents Centre of Lithuania's Ministry of the Interior which produces all of Lithuania's identity cards, passports, and driver's licenses, as well as residency permits. Issuance of residence permits is controlled by Vilnius City Migration Service, which is housed in Žirmūnai too. The State Tax Inspectorate has an office in Šiaurės Miestelis, providing services to private as well as legal persons. There are also several medicine-related institutions, such as the Ministry of Health's State Public Health Service, the Vilnius city morgue. The Institute of Forensic Medicine of the Mykolas Romeris University was headquartered in Šiaurės Miestelis as well. The Lithuanian National Olympic Committee, the Vilnius Department of the Lithuanian Labour Exchange at the Ministry of Social Security and Labour, the Honorary Vice-Consulate of the Kingdom of Spain, and the National Examination Center, established by the Ministry of Education to organize centralized nationwide examinations of high school graduates, all have headquarters in Žirmūnai.

=== Sports and entertainment venues ===
Several notable sports facilities are located in Žirmūnai, including Žalgiris Stadium, Lithuania's largest stadium, and Impuls Plus fitness club. Rowing practices take place on the River Neris; there is a base of operation, as well as several piers, on the Žirmūnai bank of the river. One of Lithuania's largest indoor public swimming pools was situated in Žirmūnai until the 1990s. Part of the annual international Vilnius Marathon course runs along the Žirmūnai bank of the River Neris.

Palace of Concerts and Sports

The Vilnius Palace of Concerts and Sports (Koncertų ir sporto rūmai), built in 1971 in the southernmost part of Žirmūnai in the middle of the former cemetery, is an example of Soviet Constructivism and Brutalist architecture, remarkable for its vessel-like exterior. The Palace, once one of the architectonic icons of Soviet Vilnius, was, until the 1990s, a major venue for sporting events, especially local and international basketball matches, as well as concerts and shows. Its seating capacity is about 4,400. On 22–23 October 1988 the building hosted the statutory meeting of Sąjūdis, the Lithuanian political organization that led the struggle for Lithuanian independence; on 14–15 January 1991, a public funeral for the victims of the January Events took place at the Palace. Later in the 1990s, the building was used as a temporary shopping mall where space was leased to small entrepreneurs for business exhibitions and fairs. In the 2000s developers announced plans to build multifunctional complexes, incorporating sports, business and residential structures, that would replace Žalgiris Stadium and the Palace of Concerts and Sports; the projects have been stalled due to the inclusion of the Palace into the list "Registry of Cultural Values" in July 2006, and related litigation.

The Vilnius Palace of Culture, Entertainment and Sports (an example of Soviet functionalism built in 1980 as the Palace of Culture and Sports of the Ministry of Interior), hosts several amateur art clubs (choirs in particular), and is also used for indoor sports (wrestling, martial arts, artistic gymnastics, volleyball, basketball), as well as lawn tennis, including two clay courts.

Oskaras Koršunovas Theatre has occupied the former Lietuvos Rytas Arena which was the home of Lithuania's starring basketball team Lietuvos Rytas until the 2004 season, and was also used by the former women's basketball team BC Teo. Along with the Vilnius Palace of Culture, Entertainment and Sports, it was used in 2006 as part of the set for 9/11: The Twin Towers, a docudrama about the September 11, 2001 attacks in New York City, a Dangerous Films production for BBC and Discovery Channel. Ūkio banko teatro arena ("Ūkio Bankas Theater Arena") is now the venue of performances of Eimuntas Nekrošius of Meno Fortas and Anželika Cholina Dance Theatre.

Southern Žirmūnai's sporting connections are reflected in the names of the streets along the Žirmūnai side of the River Neris: Sporto ("Sports") and Olimpiečių ("Olympians"). The Palace of Students' Technical Creative Work of the Republic is Lithuania's largest facility for high school students' after-school activities of a technical nature, such as model building and go-kart racing. The Grand Theater of Vilnius (Didysis Vilniaus teatras) is a small theater (its misnomer is intentional) that is formally based in Šiaurės miestelis; it has no venue of its own and holds performances in other theaters.

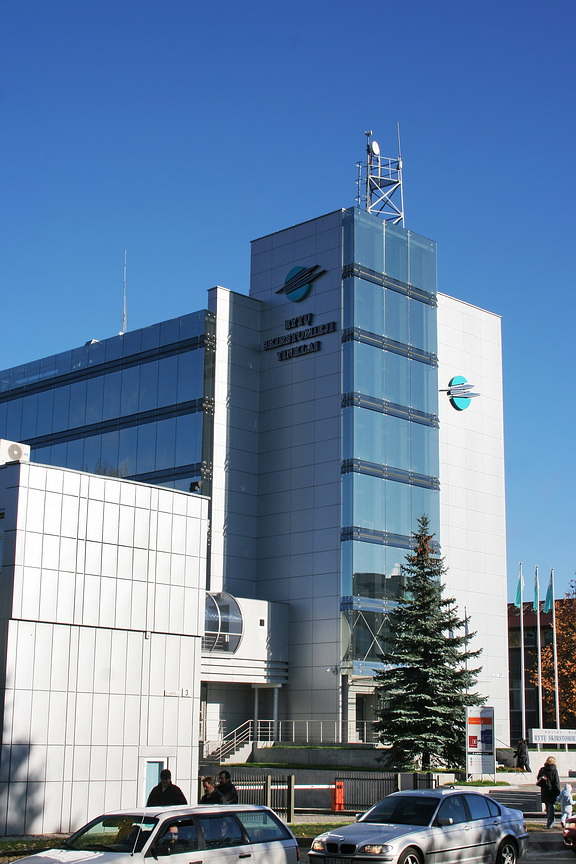
Rytų skirstomieji tinklai, a major electricity provider (2006)

A building close to the western border of the Žirmūnai elderate, an example of Socialist historicism built soon after the end of World War II, was the home of the Tėvynė ("Motherland") Cinema until the early 1990s; it has been hosting the New York musical theatre and club since 2004. It is unclear whether this building will be demolished to make way for underground parking lots or saved by virtue of its inclusion into the Registry of Cultural Values.

=== Commercial and industrial facilities ===
1,414 businesses, comprising 8.7% of all Vilnius' businesses, were headquartered in the Žirmūnai elderate in 2003. Lithuania's largest electricity distribution network operator, Rytų skirstomieji tinklai, operates from Žirmūnai, as well as TELE2, one of Lithuania's three mobile communications operators; Ogmios, one of Lithuania's largest retailers and wholesalers of home appliances; and Vilpra, Lithuania's largest dealer of heating equipment.

In 1992, the former prominent Lithuanian basketball player Šarūnas Marčiulionis and his business partners opened the Šarūnas Hotel in Žirmūnai.

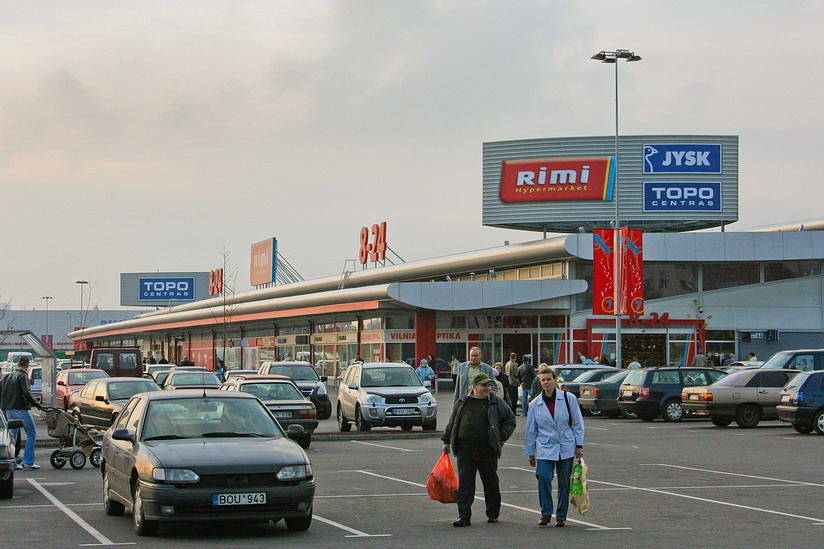
Rimi Hypermarket shopping center in Šiaurės miestelis (2006)

The Banginis and Rimi Hypermarket, located in Šiaurės miestelis, are among Lithuania's largest shopping centers. Vilniaus duona ("The Bread of Vilnius"), Lithuania's largest baking company, operates one of its bakeries in Žirmūnai.

An abundance of automotive service facilities and car dealerships are located in the elderate.

The northern part of Žirmūnai was an important part of the Lithuanian SSR's industrial sector during the 1960s, 1970s, and 1980s. The Kuro aparatūros gamykla (Fuel Equipment Factory) is now bankrupt; Sigma, formerly one of the leading manufacturers of electronics and computer components in the Soviet Union, which contributed to the description of the Lithuanian SSR as "The Soviet Silicon Valley", continues to operate at a minimum level; and Vilma remains Lithuania's largest manufacturer of electrical products.

== Transport ==
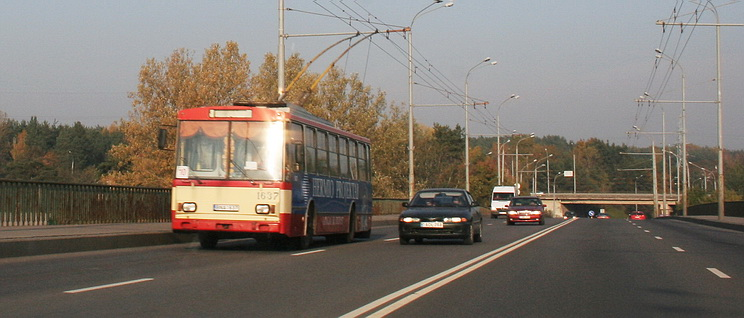
A trolleybus crossing the Valakupiai Bridge (2006)

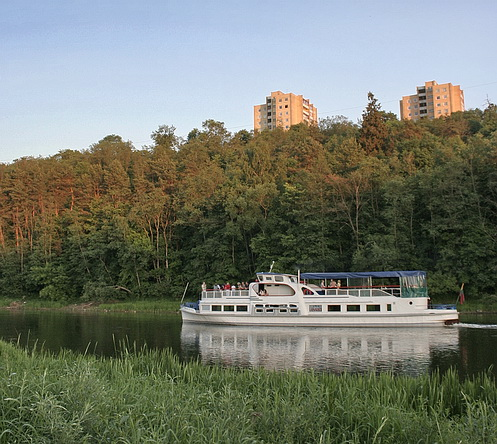
A pleasure cruise on the River Neris along northern Žirmūnai

Žirmūnai is well-served by Vilnius' bus and trolleybus transportation network. One of Vilnius' trolleybus hubs is located in the northernmost part of Žirmūnai elderate, and Vilniaus Autobusai, Vilnius' main bus operator, is headquartered and has its main depot in Žirmūnai. Žirmūnai suffers from rush hour traffic jams. The street network in the district was primarily designed in the Soviet era for a much lower vehicle traffic.

Žirmūnai is linked to the elderate of Antakalnis by three bridges over the River Neris: Valakampiai Bridge, the longest bridge in Vilnius, built in 1972; the Šilas Bridge, built in 1999, and Žirmūnai Bridge, built in 1965. The Mindaugas Bridge was built in 2003 to link Žirmūnai with Vilnius' Old Town. Passenger ferry transport on the Neris was active until the 1990s, but is now limited to occasional chartered sightseeing tours from the Mindaugas Bridge to Valakampiai in summer.

For some time in the first half of the 20th century, a narrow-gauge railway traversed Žirmūnai following the approximate course of the modern Minties Street; it crossed over the River Neris on a bridge located near the modern Šilas Bridge, as can be seen in the 1942 map of Vilnius.

== See also ==
- History of Vilnius
