= Mindaugas Bridge =

Bridge in Vilnius, Lithuania

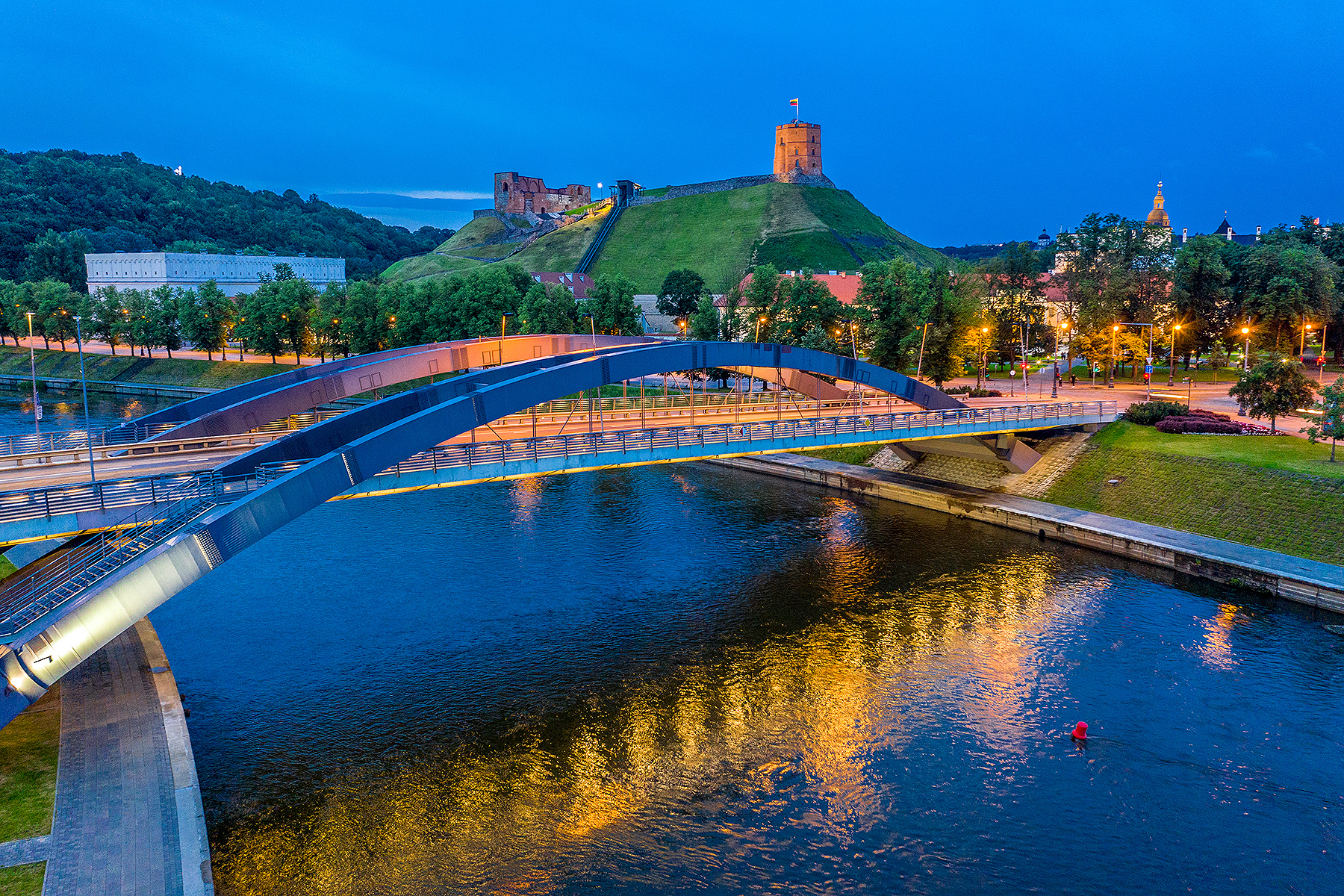
- Coordinates: 54°41′20″N 25°17′18″E
- Crosses: Neris River
- Locale: Vilnius
- Preceded by: Žirmūnai Bridge
- Followed by: Green Bridge

Characteristics
- Total length: 101 metres (331 ft)
- Width: 19.75 metres (64.8 ft)

History
- Opened: 2003

Location
- Interactive map of Mindaugas Bridge

The Mindaugas Bridge (Lithuanian: Mindaugo tiltas) is a bridge in Vilnius, Lithuania. It crosses Neris River and connects Žirmūnai elderate with the Old Town of Vilnius. The bridge was named after Mindaugas, King of Lithuania, and was opened in 2003 during the celebrations of the 750th anniversary of Mindaugas' coronation. The bridge is 101 metres (331 ft) in length and 19.7 metres (65 ft) in width.

== Gallery ==
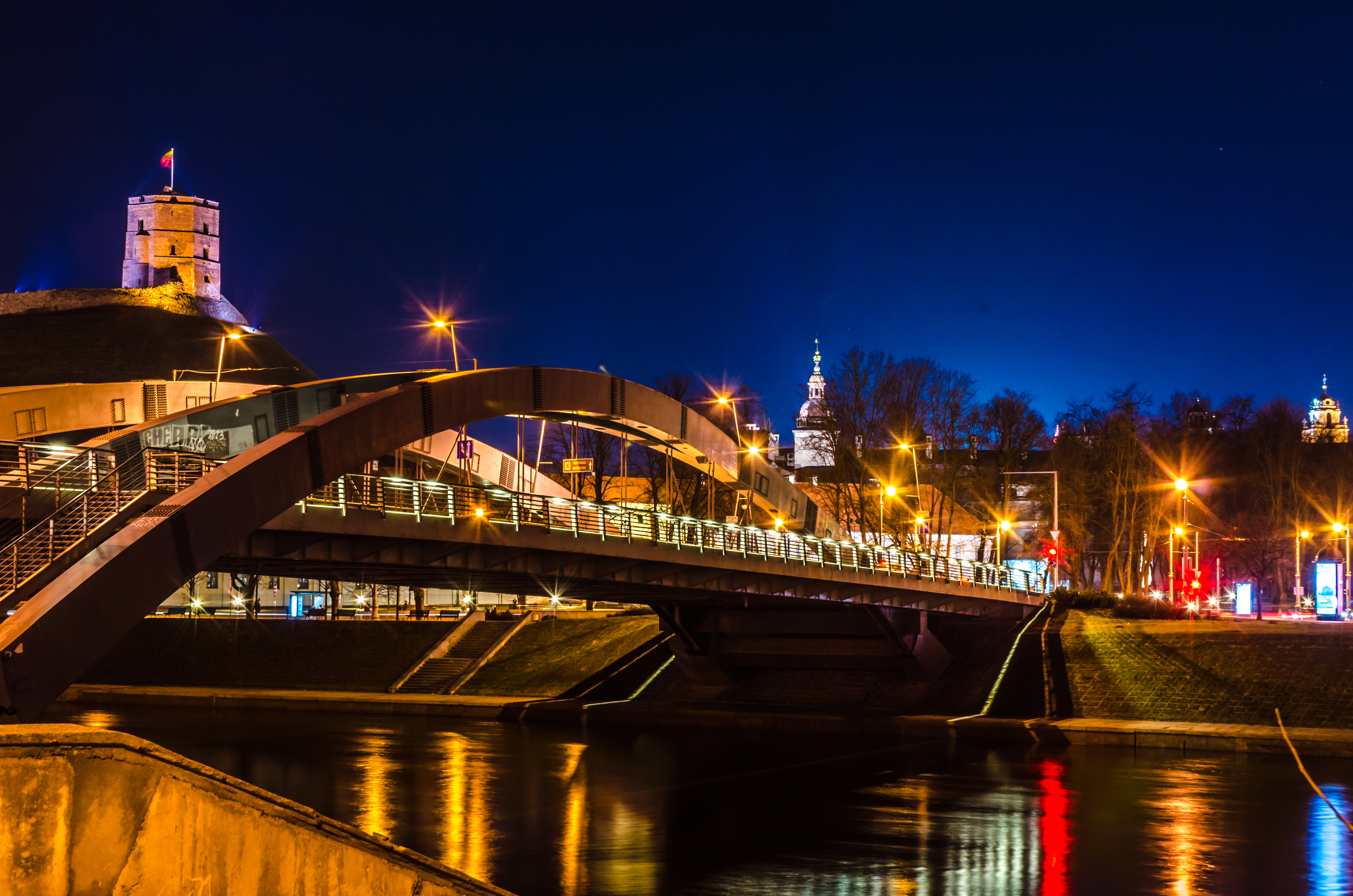
Bridge at night.

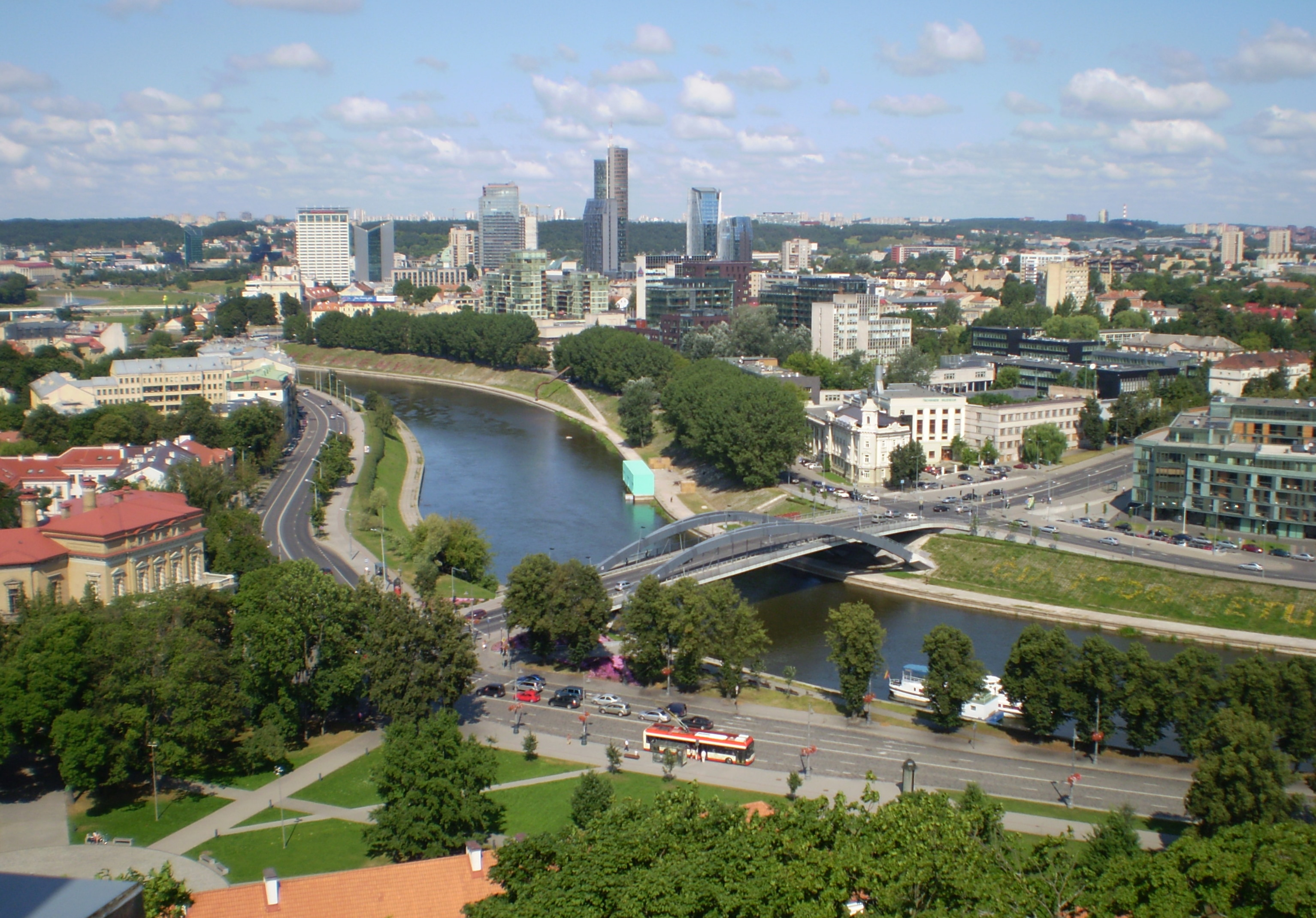
Bridge as seen from top of Gediminas Tower.
