= Tuskulėnai Manor =

History museum in Vilnius, Lithuania

Coordinates: 54°41′53″N 25°18′08″E

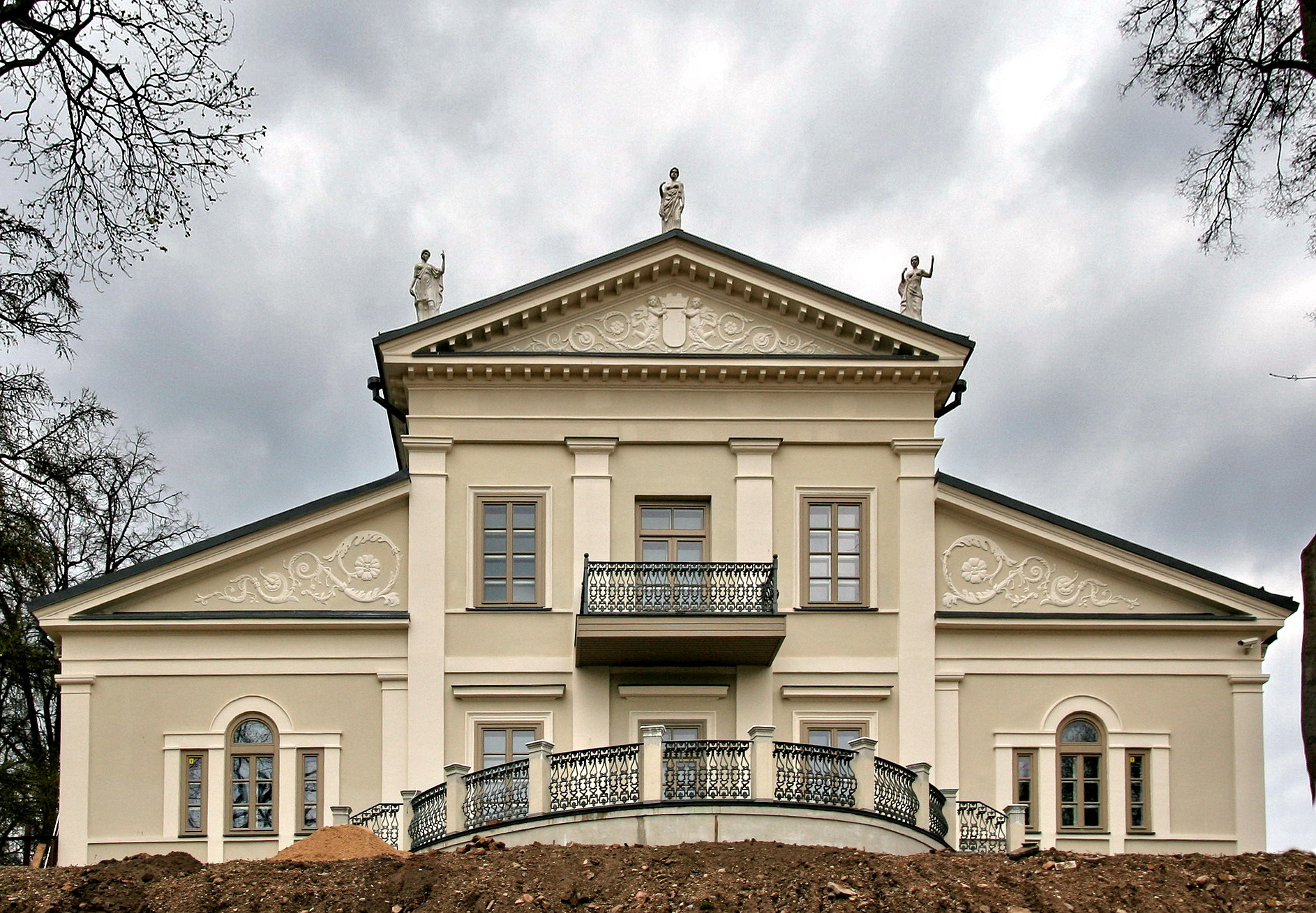
- Restored Tuskulėnai manor palace
- Location: Žirmūnai elderate, Vilnius, Lithuania
- Type: History museum
- Owner: Lithuanian Genocide and Resistance Research Center

Tuskulėnai Manor (Lithuanian: Tuskulėnų dvaras) is a neoclassical manor in Žirmūnai elderate of Vilnius, Lithuania. It is perhaps best known as a burial ground for people executed by the KGB in 1944–1947. After Lithuania regained independence in 1990, the manor was reconstructed and the park was transformed into a memorial to the victims of Soviet repressions. It is administered by the Lithuanian Genocide and Resistance Research Center.

== Structures ==
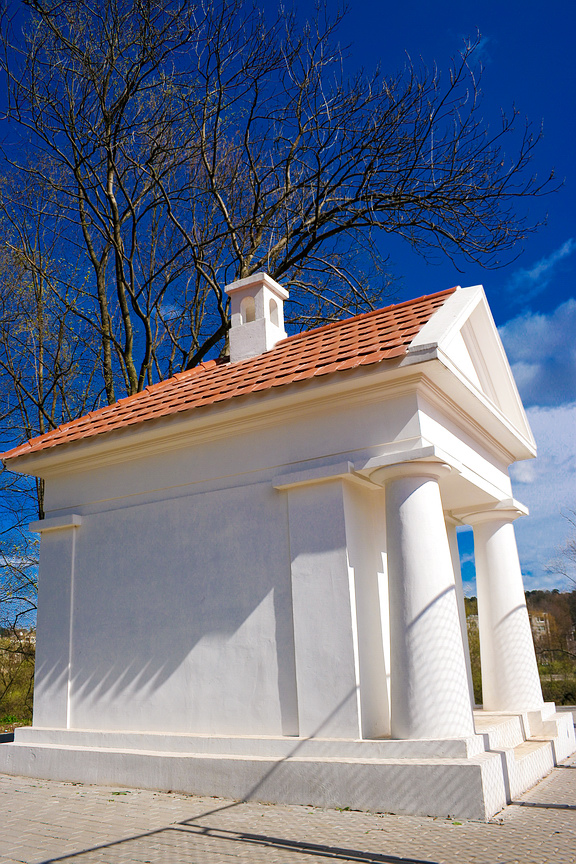
Chapel of St. Theresa

The Tuskulėnai Manor is the oldest architectural monument in Žirmūnai. The present manor was built in 1825, following a design by Karol Podczaszyński in the neoclassical style, by the order of the Governor General of Lithuania, Alexander Rimsky-Korsakov. It consists of the principal building - the palace, a storage house, and several adjacent buildings, including a small eclectic chapel of St. Theresa, located approximately 100 metres south of the principal building.

The palace is the main architectural accent of the ensemble, showing clear influence of Palladian layout. Typical Podczaszyński's serlianas – three interconnected windows - have been employed in the façades of the main palace. Three statues of Roman goddesses Diana, Juno and Venus used to stand on a front one, were removed later on and restored in 2007. Their reconstruction was in part based on works of French sculptor Jean-Nicolas-Louis Durand. The side entrances with balconies had also been destroyed back in the late 19th century and restored. The interior was decorated with the works of Dutch painters Isaac van Ostade, Adriaen van Ostade, Gerard Dou and others. Numerous frescoes have been discovered in the interior of the main palace and restored by 2009. The palace also boasted a rich library.

All of these structures underwent restoration between 2005 and 2008.

The buildings are located within The Memorial Complex of Tuskulėnai Peace Park (Tuskulėnų rimties parko memorialinis kompleksas). The 7.5-hectare park includes the restored Tuskulėnai Manor, which hosts a museum of martyrology in Lithuania during the second half of the 20th century (a branch of the Lithuanian Museum of Genocide Victims), restored ponds and park vegetation, as well as the columbarium.

== History ==
=== Polish–Lithuanian Commonwealth ===
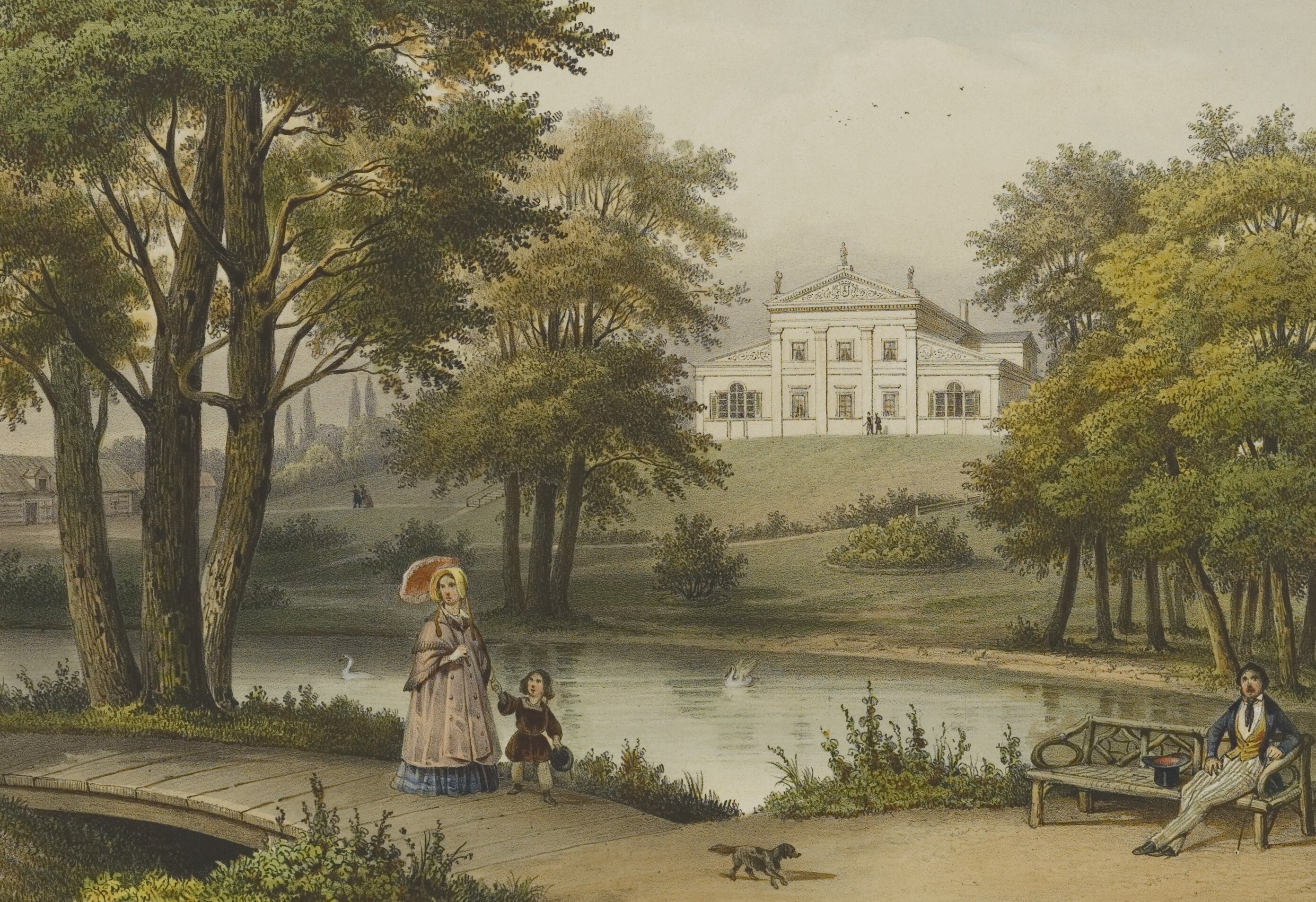
Drawing of the Tuskulėnai Manor in 1848

In the area on the right bank of the Neris River opposite the St. Peter and St. Paul's Church in Antakalnis, the Royal Manor, so called Derevnictva (Polish: Derewnictwo), was established in the middle 16th century by the King Sigismund Augustus in order to supply vegetables and meat to Vilnius Castles. The manor was held by the kings Sigismund III Vasa and Władysław IV Vasa, nobleman M. Piegłowski, the Wołowicz family, Grand Hetman of Lithuania Michał Kazimierz Pac, as well as the Tyzenhaus family (since 1741). The manor was named Tusculanum after a resort area near Rome in the place of the ancient Roman city of Tusculum by Lateran monks, who owned the central part of the manor in the middle 18th century after it was partitioned into the folwarks of Tuskulėnai (or Tuskulionys), based on the kernel of the old royal manor, and Derevnictva.

=== Russian Empire ===
Under the rule of the Russian Empire in the 19th century, Tuskulėnai Manor was held by various noble families and high-ranking state officials. In the mid-19th century the main palace was transformed into a guesthouse by prominent doctor and public activist Julian Titius that became a cultural center in Vilnius, often visited by Stanisław Moniuszko and Józef Ignacy Kraszewski. The manor passed into the possession of Julija Safranovich after 1886, and then was held by the noble family of Melentjevy until World War II.

=== Soviet era ===
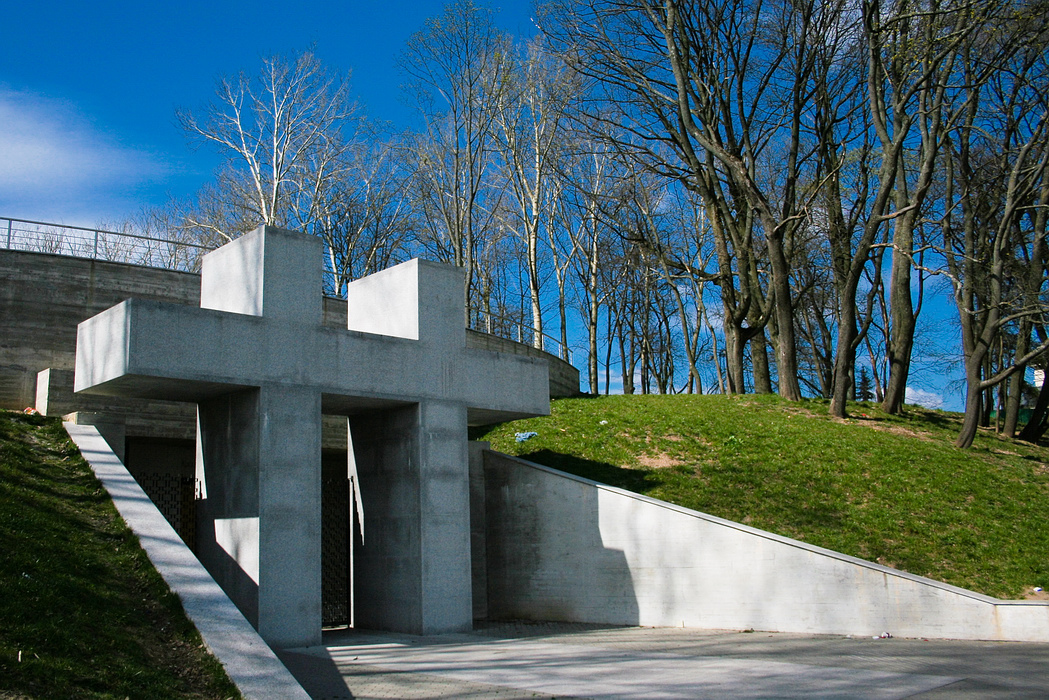
Entrance to the columbarium in Tuskulėnai, containing the remains of the victims

Tuskulėnai Manor was nationalised in 1940 and was later used as KGB officers' apartments and as a kindergarten. From 1944 to 1947, the Soviet secret police carried out 767 death sentences (among them 559 Lithuanians, 18 Latvians, 9 Ukrainians and 38 Germans) in the basement cells of the NKVD/MVD prison.

During excavations that took place between 1994 and 1996 in its territory, the remains of 706 bodies were found; 40 were identified. The area had been used to hide the bodies of Lithuanian residents – mostly resistance fighters against the Soviet occupation, Nazi collaborators and Armia Krajowa soldiers – who had been executed between 1944 and 1947 by the NKGB and MGB in the Vilnius' KGB Palace prison near Lukiškės Square (now Museum of Genocide Victims). The remains from the mass grave were placed in a columbarium built underground, beneath an artificial hill, and consecrated in 2004.

The area surrounding the Tuskulėnai Manor was referred to as Tuskulionys (Russian: Tuskuljany; Polish: Tuskulanum) until World War II. This area was also known by the colloquial placename Losiovka, named after A. Losev, colonel of Special Corps of Gendarmes and later general of the Russian Empire, who owned the folwark of Tuskulėnai in 1869.
