= Vilnius Žirmūnai Gymnasium =

Coordinates: 54°42′52″N 25°18′31″E

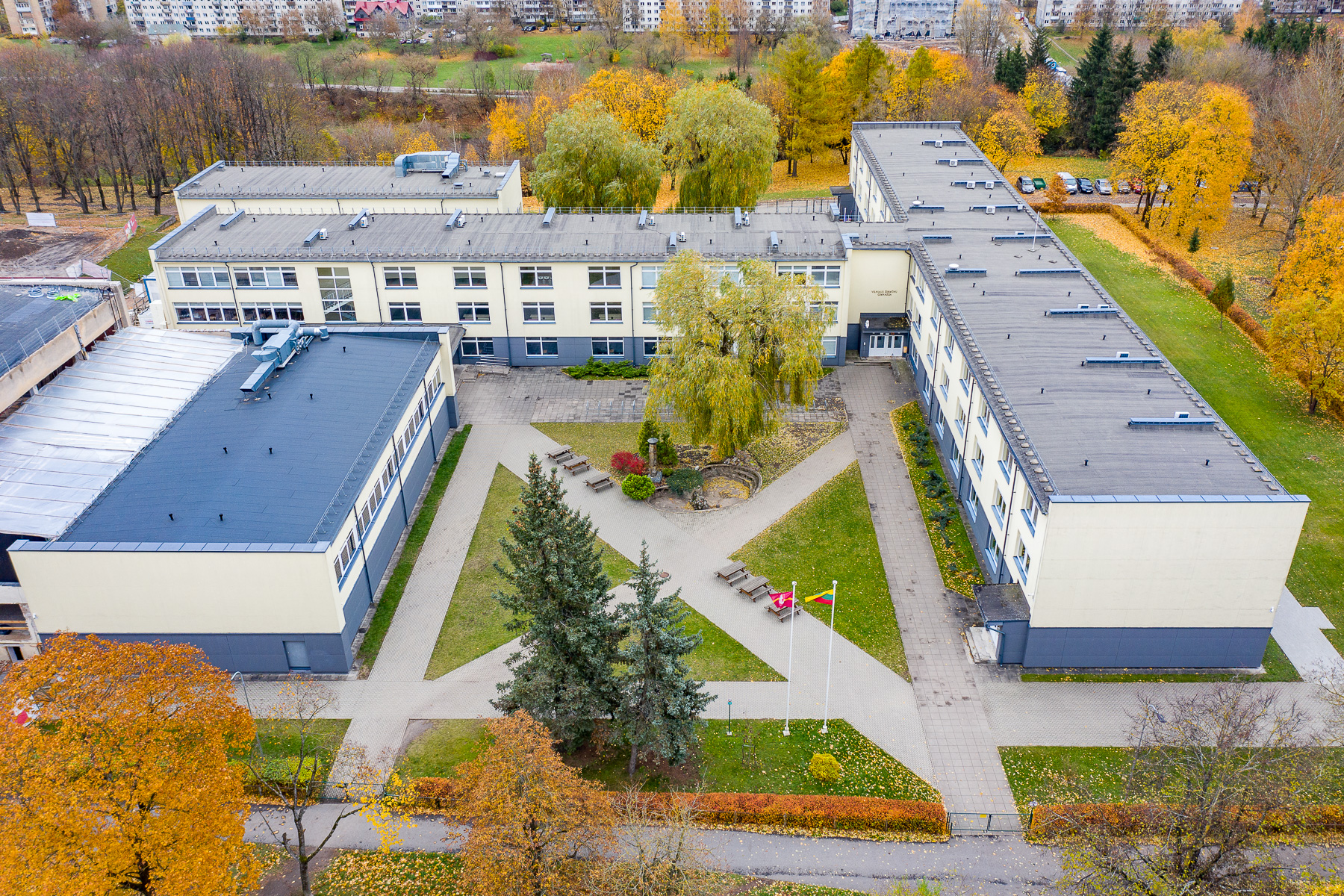

Location
- Žirmūnų g. 37; Vilnius; Lithuania

Information
- School type: Gymnasium
- Opened: 1905
- Principal: Jonas Montvidas(2020)
- Grades: 9-12
- Gender: Co-Education
- Enrollment: 773
- Average class size: 26.7
- Website: www.vzgimnazija.eu

Vilnius Žirmūnai Gymnasium is a Lithuanian language gymnasium school located in Žirmūnai district of Vilnius, Lithuania.

It used to be known as Vilnius Secondary School No. 7. The Gymnasium had 800 students in 2006. The school was granted the title Gymnasium in 2000; it is home to the brass band Septima, established in 1966.

== Students ==
- Egidijus Bičkauskas (b. 1955), Seimas member, politician
- Ramūnas Greičius (b. 1968), cinema director
- Arvydas Juozaitis (b. 1956), Olympic swimmer
- Lina Kačiušytė (b. 1963), swimming coach, Olympic champion
- Mindaugas Kiškis, lawyer and professor
- Algirdas Petras Stabinis (b. 1943), physicist, professor
- Ingrida Šimonytė (b. 1974), politician, Seimas member, Prime Minister
