= Jewish cemeteries of Vilnius =

Cemeteries in Lithuania

Coordinates: 54.692°N 25.291°E

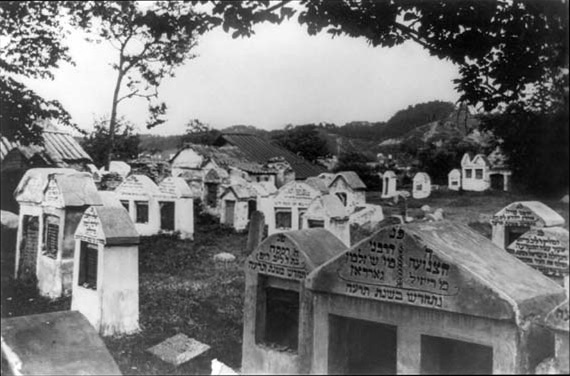
Jewish Cemetery in 1922

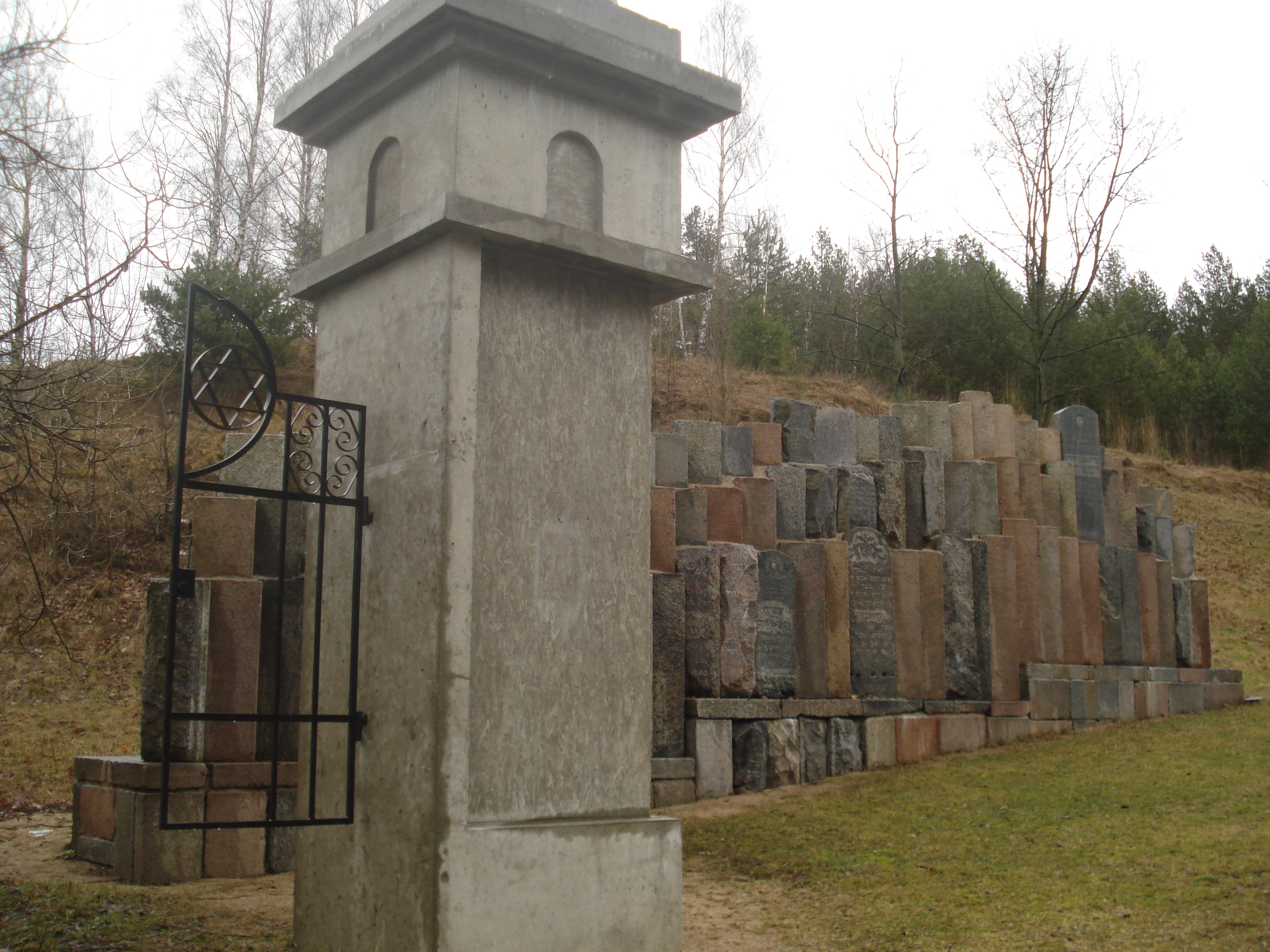
Memorial in the site of the former New Cemetery in Užupis

The Jewish cemeteries of Vilnius are the three Jewish cemeteries of the Lithuanian Jews living in what is today Vilnius, the capital of Lithuania, which was known to them for centuries as Vilna, the principal city of the Grand Duchy of Lithuania and the Pale of Settlement of the Russian Empire. Two of the cemeteries were built over during the Soviet period and the third is still active.

== The old cemetery in Šnipiškės ==
The oldest and the largest Jewish cemetery was established in the 15th century in the Šnipiškės suburb to the north of the Vilnius Old Town, now in Žirmūnai elderate, across the Neris River from the Gediminas Tower. In Vilna Jewish culture, the cemetery was known as Piramont.

Following a decision by the Tsarist authorities in 1817, it was effectively closed in 1831 when its southern part, comprising a quarter of the original area, was razed to make way for a citadel on the north bank of the Neris, completed in 1837 and closed down itself in 1878. The field north of the remaining part of the cemetery was used for sports and military exercises, and a hippodrome was built in 1900.

After the incorporation of the Republic of Central Lithuania into the Second Polish Republic in 1922, the Polish municipal authorities of Vilnius acquired the remaining cemetery grounds from the army. In 1929, the Pióromont Stadium was opened in the field just north of the Pióromont Street and the surviving cemetery wall. Between 1932 and 1935, the State Office of Physical Education and Military Training developed plans to expand the existing stadium into a large sports complex comprising a swimming pool, a harbour, and a sports palace, proposing to take over the cemetery site, which had by then become very central within the city. The Polish law permitted the reuse of cemetery grounds fifty years after the last burial. The offer of a new cemetery plot by the municipal authorities and of the army's assistance in relocating burials was rejected by the Jewish community, led by Rabbi Chaim Ozer Grodzinski, which launched an international appeal against the planned liquidation of the old cemetery that included a letter to Pope Pius XI. According to one source, the Polish authorities declared the cemetery a museum in 1935. Another source reports that as a result of the protests, the realisation of the sports centre project that began in 1937 was restricted to leave out the cemetery site. A third source states that the conflict between the Polish authorities and the Jewish community continued until the outbreak of the World War II.

The cemetery was ruined by the Nazi German occupiers during the World War II. The poet Abraham Sutzkever, who had escaped from the Vilna Ghetto and fought as a partisan against the Nazis, reported on the German destruction of gravestones in the cemetery in his October 1944 article for the Belarusian Soviet weekly Literatura i iskusstvo. By contrast, an acquaintance of his, Leyzer Ran, who left in 1946 for the United States, wrote in his book, published in New York in 1974, that the cemetery survived the Nazi occupation "almost intact". Underground resistance leaders in the Vilna Ghetto are said to have been laid to rest there, with further burials in the post-war years.

After the war, the Executive Committee of the Lithuanian Soviet Socialist Republic revived the Polish plans for the sports complex, and on 15 October 1948 adopted a resolution to liquidate the cemetery, by then reduced in size to little over 3 ha. According to one interpretation, the cemetery was removed in an effort to forget the interwar Lithuanian republic, portrayed as bourgeois and nationalist, with its multiethnic past. The Lithuanian Soviet authorities erected a granite monument commemorating the old cemetery, and transferred historically important graves, including that of the Vilna Gaon, to the new cemetery in 1950. In the initial stage, from 1948 to 1950, the Pióromont Stadium was rebuilt as the Spartak Stadium (from 1961 Žalgiris Stadium) in accordance with Viktor Anikin's project, with the use of German prisoner-of-war labour. The removal of tombstones from the old cemetery and the relocation of selected burials was completed by 1955. The former cemetery grounds were then used for the construction of the indoor swimming pool in 1955–1956 and of the Vilnius Palace of Concerts and Sports (Lithuanian: Koncertų ir sporto rūmai) to the south of the stadium in 1971, both on sites originally proposed by Polish architects before the war, against the background of the establishment of a new commercial and social centre of Vilnius in the western part of the Šnipiškės neighbourhood. Tombstones were incorporated into the new sports facilities. Some burials still survive in areas undisturbed by building work for either the Russian fortress or the Lithuanian Soviet sports complex.

In 2005, plans to build apartment blocks in another part of the old cemetery site were criticised by international Jewish organisations, and Lithuania was condemned in a 2008 motion by the U.S. House of Representatives for its "failure to protect the historic Jewish cemetery in Vilnius". In August 2009, the municipal authorities of Vilnius reached an agreement with the Committee for the Preservation of Jewish Cemeteries in Europe (CPJCE) and the Lithuanian Jewish Community concerning the boundaries of the cemetery, granting it protected status. It was announced that buildings already in place will not be demolished.

== The cemetery in Užupis ==
The second cemetery was located in Užupis. It was active from 1828 to 1943 or 1948. It was also destroyed by the Soviet authorities in the 1960s following the destruction of the Great Synagogue of Vilna. Tombstones from the two old cemeteries were used for staircases in various construction works around the city. Currently a memorial constructed of them marks the location of the former entrance to the cemetery. Moreover, there are plans to build a monument in place of the old cemetery in Užupis.

== The new cemetery in Šeškinė ==
The new Jewish cemetery was opened in Šeškinė district near Sudervė Cemetery. Some graves of famous people, including that of the Vilna Gaon, were relocated to the new place from the old cemeteries before the destruction. Currently it has about 6,500 Jewish graves.

== See also ==
- List of cemeteries in Lithuania
