= Valakampiai Bridge =

Bridge in Lithuania

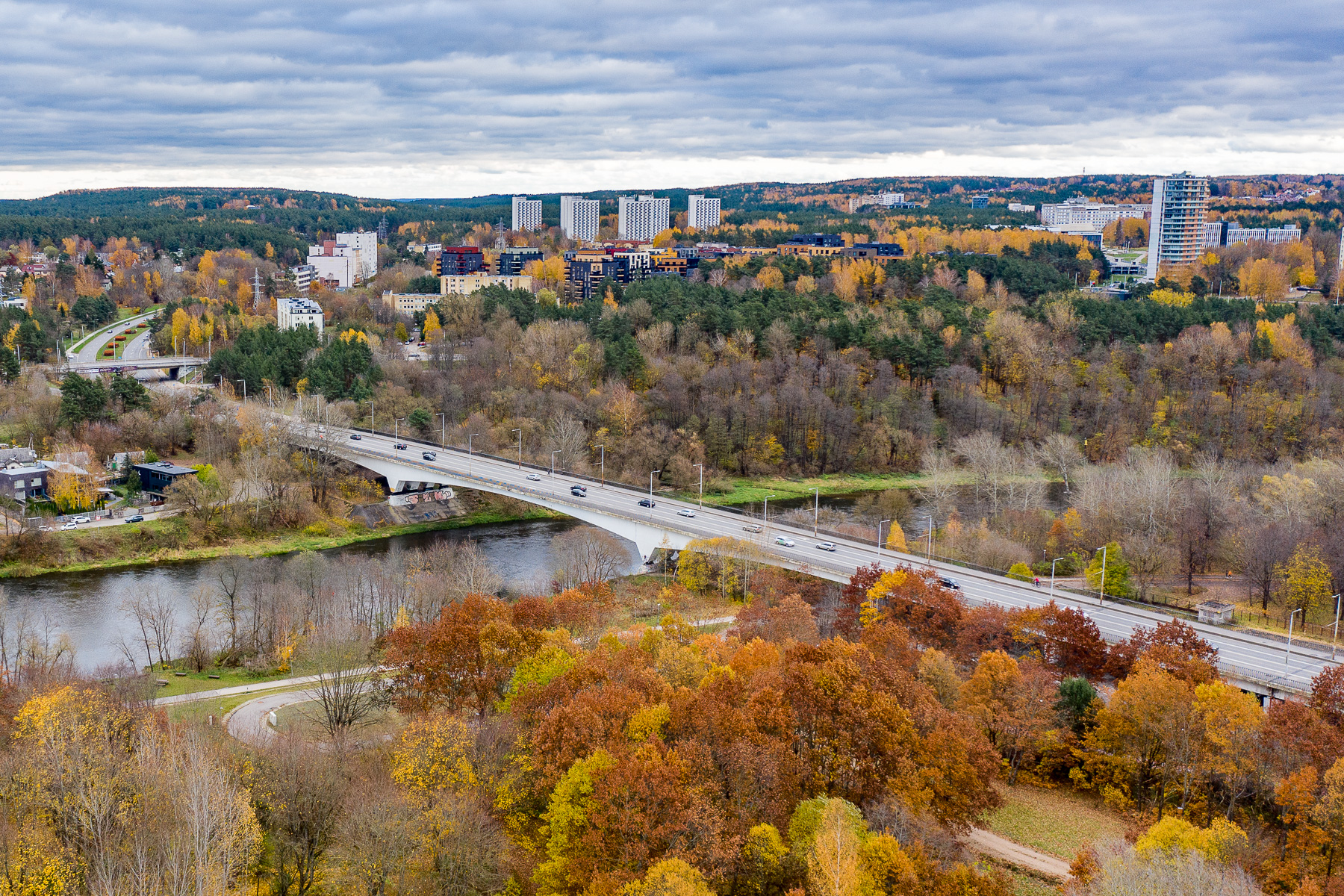
- Coordinates: 54°43′35″N 25°18′44″E
- Crosses: Neris River
- Locale: Vilnius
- Preceded by: Nemenčinė Bridge
- Followed by: Šilas Bridge

Characteristics
- Total length: 341.5 metres (1,120 ft)
- Width: 21 metres (69 ft)

History
- Construction end: 1972

Location
- Interactive map of Valakampiai Bridge

Valakampiai Bridge (Lithuanian: Valakampių tiltas) also known as Valakupiai Bridge (Lithuanian: Valakupių tiltas) is a bridge across Neris River, that connects Žirmūnai and Antakalnis districts of Vilnius. Built in 1972. As of 2007, it is the longest bridge in Vilnius, 341.5 metres long and approximately 21.0 metres wide. The bridge has six spans: the major one, 100.0 metres long is over the river, the second one is on the left bank and four-span viaduct is on the right bank. It is made of ferroconcrete blocks, connected by wire fibers into inseparable ferroconcrete beams.
