= Meno Fortas =

Lithuanian theatre facility and theatre troupe

Meno Fortas is a theatrical production facility and theater group in Vilnius formed and directed by Lithuanian Eimuntas Nekrošius since 1998. It was specifically created for the production of works under this director, but is also active in the formation of young theater arts professionals and the promotion of Lithuanian theatre tradition both at home and abroad. The institution does not have its own theater and performs heavily abroad at theatre festivals. The institution is known for its streamlined stagings, heavy on metaphor, with most of its stories based on known plays, including major works by Shakespeare, Anton Chekov and Fyodor Dostoyevsky. These productions are an extension of Nekrošius's directing career which began in the 1970s.

== The institution ==
Meno Fortas was formed in 1998 as a private, non-profit institution by Eimuntas Nekrošius, Nadežda Gultiajeva and The Ministry of Culture of the Republic of Lithuania. (shorthis) The name translates to “fortress of art,” and applies to the Vilnius-based production facility as well as the theater company. The focus of the institution is to produce works created and/or directed by Lithuanian director Eimuntas Nekrošius in Lithuania and abroad. Most of these works represent Lithuanian theatrical tradition and are promoted by the company to a wider audience. However, it also works to on collaborative projects with other institutions, training young theater artists, organize various types of cultural events financed by both public and private monies. Meno Fortas has been a member of the Union of the Theatres of Europe since 2000.

There are different artists working constantly in the studio, chamber concerts and performances are taking place here as well. After 2007, the group added chamber theatre to its repertoire. Meno Fortas does not have its own building, but rather rents space for its offices and rehearsal rooms and performances are held in rented theatres. The company performs about fifty times a year outside of the country, mostly of works such as Song of Songs, The Seasons by Kristijonas Donelaitis and the Shakespeare trilogy of Hamlet, Macbeth and Othello. The group is part of strong theatre scene in that exists in the capital of Vilnius despite the country's poverty. It also has a very strong tradition of the theater being dominated by its directors.

== Eimuntas Nekrošius ==
Eimuntas Nekrošius, born 1952, is a graduate of the Lunacharsky Art Institute (today Russian Academy of Theatre Arts) in Moscow. He began his directing career as the “enfant terrible” of the Vilnius State Youth Theater, working there from 1978 to 1991, with a short stint from 1979 to 1980 at the Kaunas National Drama Theatre. During the Soviet era, major works that he produced include such as The Square by Yeliseyeva in 1980, Love and Death in Verona by Antanėlis and Geda (1982), Pirosmani, Pirosmani, A Day Longer Than a Hundred Years by Aitmatov (1983) and Uncle Vanya by Chekhov (1986). Of these the two most important were The Square and Uncle Vanya. In the first, life in prison was measured by counting sugar cubes, which audiences interpreted as a metaphor for Soviet life and in the latter, Astrov's maps were tiny postage stamps, which Yelena viewed through a very large magnifying screen. This performance of Uncle Vanya broke the tradition of staging this play set by Constantin Stanislavski . His performances produced by the LIFE Festival include Mozart and Salieri, Don Juan, Plague by Pushkin (1994), Three Sisters by Chekhov (1995) and Love and Death in Verona (1996), all of which were also presented at various international theater festivals. This work popularized a new trend in Lithuanian theatre based on poetry and metaphor, with the main focus on psychology and emotion with relatively plastic acting. Scenery, while sparse, is important to give multiple layers to the use of metaphor. Nekrošius has continued with this style of production as founder and director of Meno Fortas, founded 1998. The director has received a number of awards for his work include best stage director of the year by Lithuanian Critique, the New Reality in Europe Theater by the Europe Theater Union and the Taormina Art Festival committee and the UBU Premium of Italy.

== Productions and performances ==
Menos Forte has continued with Nekrošius streamlined, metaphoric staging. One example of this style is seen in the group's production of Faust. Its depiction of Faust is marked by the main character slowly walking downstage as other actors are flicking ropes to makes waves in yellow light. When in the middle of them, he panics, grabs his heart and falls. The ropes then cover Faust.

Meno Forte's shows are financed as international co-productions and are presented more often abroad than in Lithuania. One of its signature pieces, Hamlet, actually precedes the group as it was first performed at the LIFE Festival in 1997, being performed there for five year in a row. However, the characteristics of this piece would define Meno Fortas, as it starred a Lithuanian pop singer in the title role and featured a huge, melting chandelier made of ice hovering over the scene. The piece has been performed by the group in nearly all of Europe's main theatre festivals, winning many awards.

Macbeth was created after the formation of the theater group, premiering in 1999. In 2001, Othello was first premiered at the Venice Biennale, followed by the first opera Macbeth at the Teatro Comunale in Florence. The three Shakespeare pieces, Hamlet, Macbeth and Othello are heavily dependent on the performance of the actor in the title role. This reliance on a single main actor has forced the company to cancel shows when this actor cannot perform.

Other productions include a version of Pedro Calderón's La vida es sueño with the Compañía Estable of Colombia, Cornamusa, SA of Mexico and Teatro 4 of Argentina.

In 2003, the company created a production called The Seasons, based on an epic poem by Lithuanian writer Kristijonas Donelaitis. In the same year, a production of Anton Chekov's The Cherry Orchard was produced with Russian actors.

In 2004, the company produced a play based on the Old Testament called The Song of Songs, and the Cherry Orchard received the top prize at the Golden Mask Festival in Moscow.

In 2005, two operas were produced called the Children of Rosenthal by Leonid Desyatnikov at the Bolshoi Theater in Moscow and Boris Godunov at the Teatro Comunale in Florence.

Another major work by the group is called Faust, based on the version by Johan Wolfgang. This piece has been performed for various years in various countries including the Festival Internacional Cervantino in Mexico. Another 2006 production is Valkyrie, based on the musical piece by Richard Wagner, and which was staged at the Lithuanian National Opera and Ballet Theater in 2007.

In 2008, the company performed Anna Karenina at the Emilia Romagna Teatro in Modena and an opera called The Legend of Invisible city of Kitez, at the Teatro Lirico di Cagliari and Bolshoi Theater.

The most recent production by the company include a large scale show based on Fyodor Dostoyevsky's The Idiot.
