= Žirmūnai Bridge =

Žirmūnai Bridge Žirmūnų tiltas
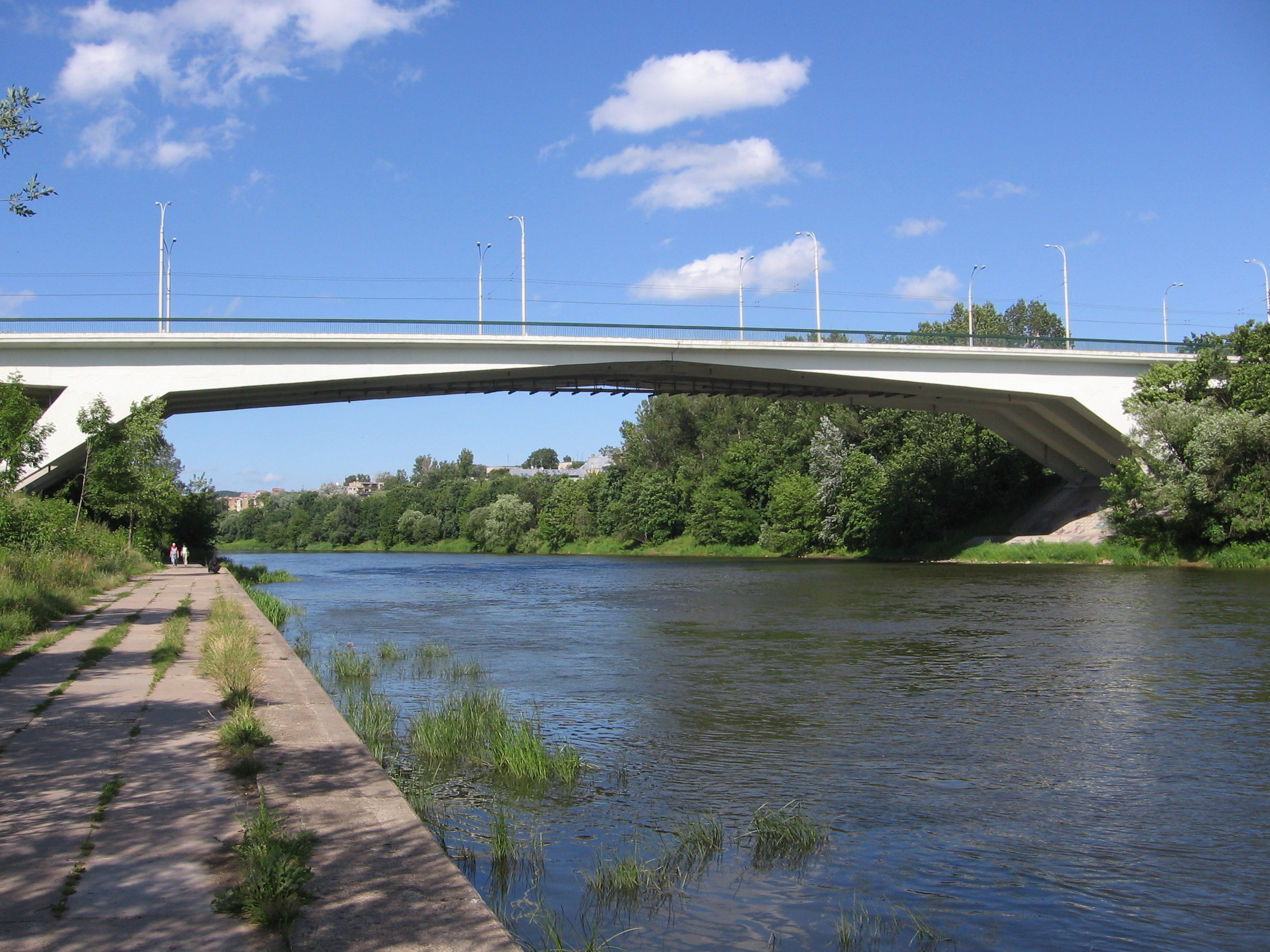
- Bridge in 2007
- Coordinates: 54°41′40″N 25°18′09″E
- Crosses: Neris River
- Locale: Vilnius
- Preceded by: Šilas Bridge
- Followed by: Mindaugas Bridge

Characteristics
- Total length: 181 metres (594 ft)

History
- Construction end: 1965

Location
- Interactive map of Žirmūnai Bridge

Žirmūnai Bridge (Lithuanian: Žirmūnų tiltas) is a bridge across Neris River, that connects Žirmūnai and Antakalnis districts of Vilnius. This is a pier ferroconcrete bridge 181 meters (594 ft) long. It has three spans and four piers. The width between handrails is 20 meters (66 ft). The bridge is a 1964 project by an institute in Leningrad. It was built in 1965 by the Second Vilnius Bridge Construction Administration.

In 2016, a sculpture called "Royal Apple" (Lithuanian: Karališkas obuolys) was placed under the bridge.
