= Zhirmuny =

Żyrmuny is the Polish name for the following locations:

- Žirmūnai – an administrative division (elderate) of Vilnius.
- Zhirmuny – a village in Hrodna Voblast of Belarus; the birthplace of Karol Podczaszyński.
