= 1828 in architecture =

The year 1828 in architecture involved some significant events.

== Buildings ==
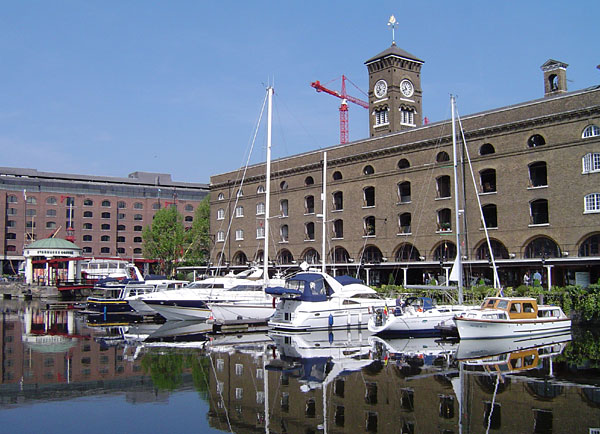
St Katharine Docks, London

=== Openings ===
- July 17 – Stone Kingston Bridge, London, designed by Edward Lapidge.
- October 25 – St Katharine Docks in London, designed by Philip Hardwick.

=== Completions ===
- St Stephen's Church, Edinburgh, designed by William Henry Playfair.
- St John on Bethnal Green, London, designed by John Soane.
- Second Christiansborg Palace, Copenhagen, Denmark.
- Flagstaff Tower, Delhi, India.
- Jašiūnai Manor, Lithuania, designed by Karol Podczaszyński.

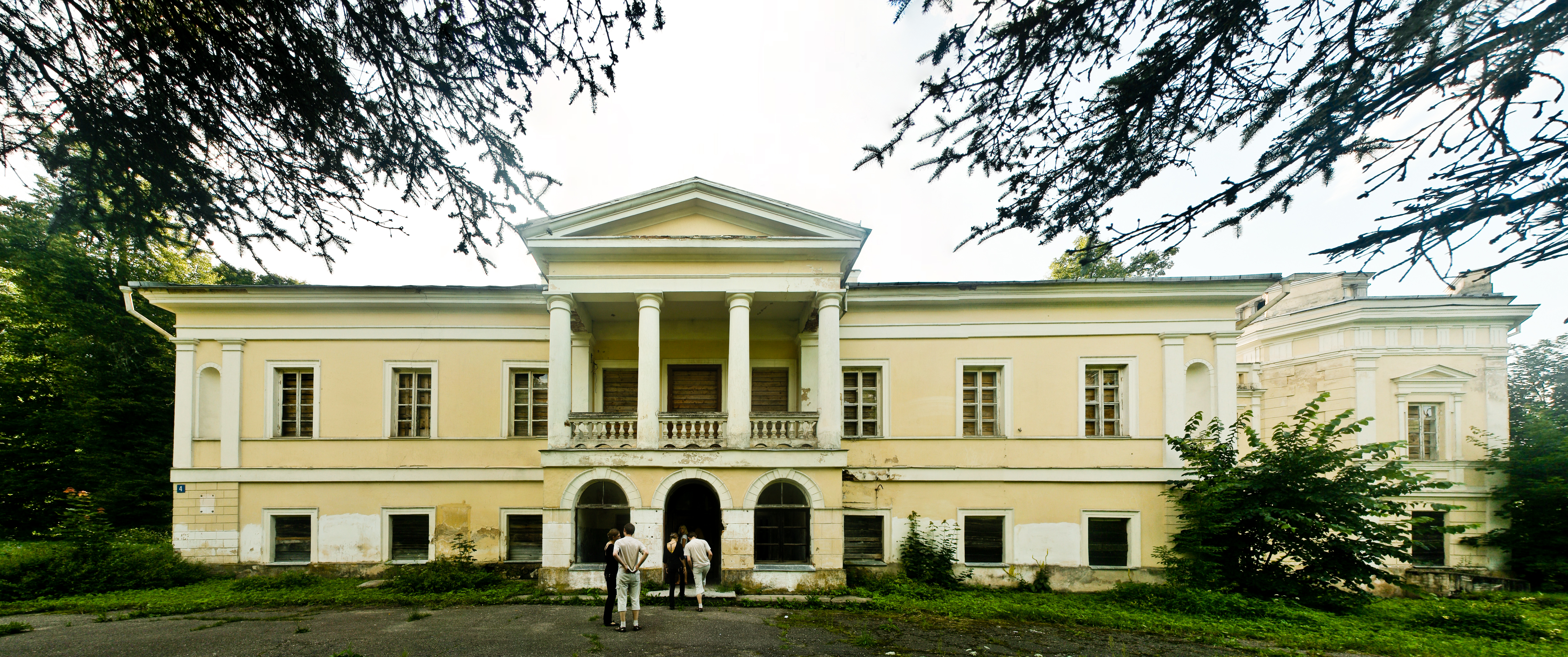
Jašiūnai Manor

- Raczyński Library, Poznań, Poland.
- Kremlin Arsenal, Moscow, Russia.
- Pont de l'Archevêché, Paris, France.
- Chaudière Bridge, Ottawa, Canada, designed by Colonel John By.
- Kings Bridge, Dublin, Ireland, designed by George Papworth.
- Western Pavilion, Brighton, UK, designed by Amon Henry Wilds.
- Westminster Arcade in Providence, Rhode Island, USA, built by Russell Warren and James Bucklin.

== Events ==
- Heinrich Hübsch's In welchem Style sollen wir bauen? ("In which style should we build?") is published.
- Completion of restoration work on Touro Synagogue in Newport, Rhode Island, an early example of building restoration in the United States.

== Births ==
- June 9 – George Goldie, English church architect (died 1887)
- June 15 – Thomas Newenham Deane, Irish architect (died 1899)

== Deaths ==
- March 12 – William Stretton, English architect, 72
- March 28 – William Thornton, British-American physician, inventor, painter and architect, 68
