= Church of the Blessed Virgin Mary, Grodno =

Former Roman Catholic church in Grodno, Belarus

Coordinates: 53°40′49″N 23°49′44″E

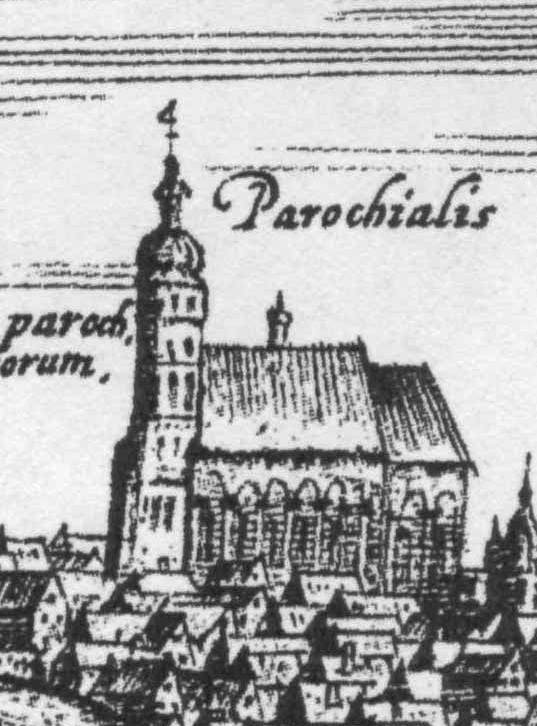
Original church c. 1600

Church of the Blessed Virgin Mary (Belarusian: Касцёл Найсвяцейшай Дзевы Марыі; Lithuanian: Švenčiausios Mergelės Marijos bažnyčia; Polish: Kościół Najświętszej Maryi Panny) was a Roman Catholic parish church in the city of Grodno. It was founded by Vytautas, Grand Duke of Lithuania before 1389 during the Christianization of Lithuania. Because of its founder, it was commonly referred to as Vytautas' Church (Belarusian: Фара Вітаўта; Lithuanian: Vytauto bažnyčia; Polish: fara witoldowa). Rebuilt as a Gothic church around 1494, it was one of Grodno's principal Catholic churches until the post-World War II Soviet occupation. It was used by the Russian Orthodox Church since 1804 for roughly a century after the Catholic church was confiscated by the Russian Tsar. It was given back to the Roman Catholic Church during the interwar and World War II, except during the Soviet occupation of 1940–1941. Neglected in the aftermath of World War II, it was finally demolished in 1961.

== History ==
=== In the Grand Duchy of Lithuania (1389–1795) ===
==== 14th and 15th centuries ====
The exact date of its consecration remains unknown, it was first mentioned in a royal privilege for the local Jewish community issued in 1389. The original church was a wooden structure, one of several dozens of such churches founded throughout Lithuania by newly-Christianised rulers of the state. As such, the church was to spread Catholic faith in a predominantly-Orthodox city. In 1494, Grand Duke of Lithuania (and later King of Poland) Alexander Jagiellon demolished the old wooden structure and erected a new church on its place. Its Gothic features continued to be visible despite numerous reconstructions carried out later.

==== 16th century ====
The first one of numerous reconstructions took place in 1551, when Bona Sforza, Queen Consort of Poland, financed the Renaissance reconstruction of the interior.

The church became a de facto royal chapel in 1584, when king Stephen Báthory moved his seat to the Grodno castle and spent his last years there. It was him to completely demolish the wooden structure and build a new church there, this time brick-made. The works, carried over by the Jesuits, were completed in 1587. The project is attributed to Ioseph Roiten, though the attribution is not certain, while the master supervising the construction works was Antoni de Greta. It was in this church that Báthory's body was first interred for several months before it was moved to the Wawel Cathedral in Kraków.

==== 17th century ====
During The Deluge, between 1655 and 1661, the city was occupied by Muscovy and the church was badly damaged. Burnt from the inside, it was partially demolished. Local bishop of Grodno Aleksander Chodkiewicz financed the reconstruction and by 1674 the church regained its former look.

==== 18th century ====
However, in the 18th century the church was again destroyed during the Great Northern War. The king of Poland financed the reconstruction, but it is not clear whether the works were finished when in 1753 a fire struck the city and the church was yet again badly damaged. It took 5 years to rebuild it. Local priest Józef Chrebtowicz hired a renowned German architect Johann Mezer to supervise the works. The church was once again consecrated on April 18, 1758.

Another fire struck the city in 1782 – and again the church was badly damaged. King Stanisław August Poniatowski dispatched his court architect Giuseppe de Sacco to prepare a project of reconstruction. However, lack of funds and constant wars meant that the works went slow and in 1793 the church was described as a ruin.

=== In the Russian Empire (1795–1915) ===
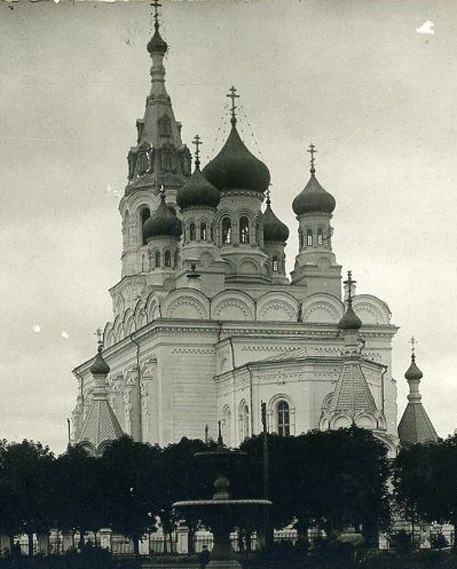
Rebuilt as Russian-style St. Sophia Cathedral

Following the Partitions of the Polish–Lithuanian Commonwealth, Grodno became part of the Russian Empire. In 1804, the Tsar Alexander I of Russia confiscated the church and gave it to Eastern Orthodox Church. The interior was redesigned to suit their needs and in 1810 the church was renamed to Saint Sophia's church. The façade and the tower were rebuilt in neo-classicist style in 1870. In 1892, however, it was burnt down again and was rebuilt. In the late 19th-century, the church was completely refurbished and rebuilt in a new, pseudo-Russian style, with the project prepared by a renowned Russian architect Nikolai Chagin around 1870.

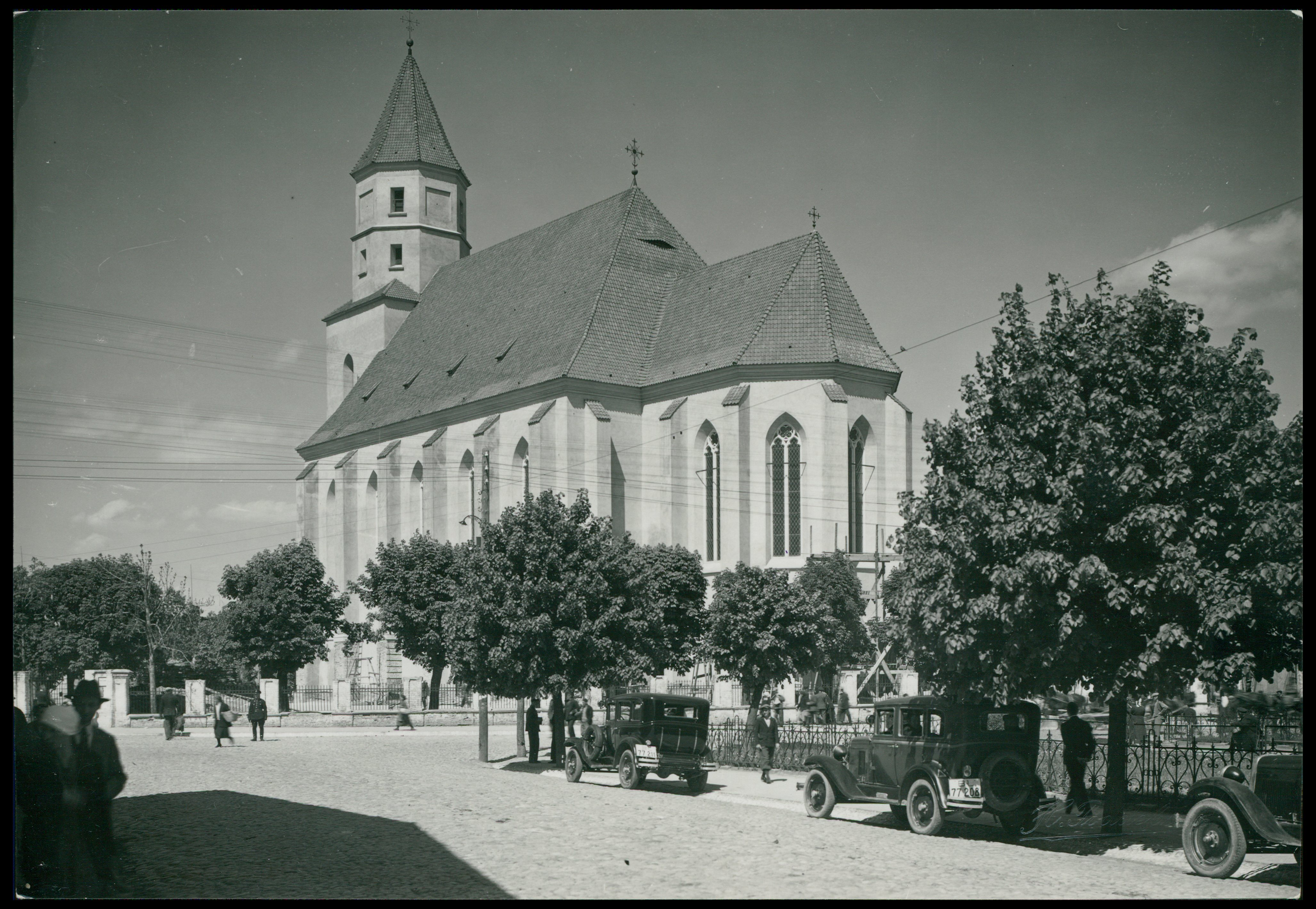
Final, Gothic Revival look of the church

=== 20th century ===
After Poland regained independence in 1918, the church was returned to the Catholic Church and once again became the city's principal Catholic church. Between 1919 and 1923 the church was repaired from the damages it suffered during World War I and the Polish–Soviet War. Soon afterwards a new reconstruction was started, this time in accordance with a Gothic revival project prepared by Oskar Sosnowski. The works continued until 1935. The shrine became a garrison church, serving both the city's inhabitants and the local units of the Polish Army.

Following the Invasion of Poland of 1939, the city was occupied by the Soviet Union and the church was nationalised and closed for the public. During the German occupation of the city it was briefly restored to Catholics. At the time, the church was allocated to Grodno's Lithuanians and Lithuanian religious services were held in it throughout the war.

After World War II the town was permanently annexed by the Soviet Union and the communist authorities turned the church into a warehouse. Finally on November 29, 1961 it was blown up.
