= Jašiūnai =

- Town
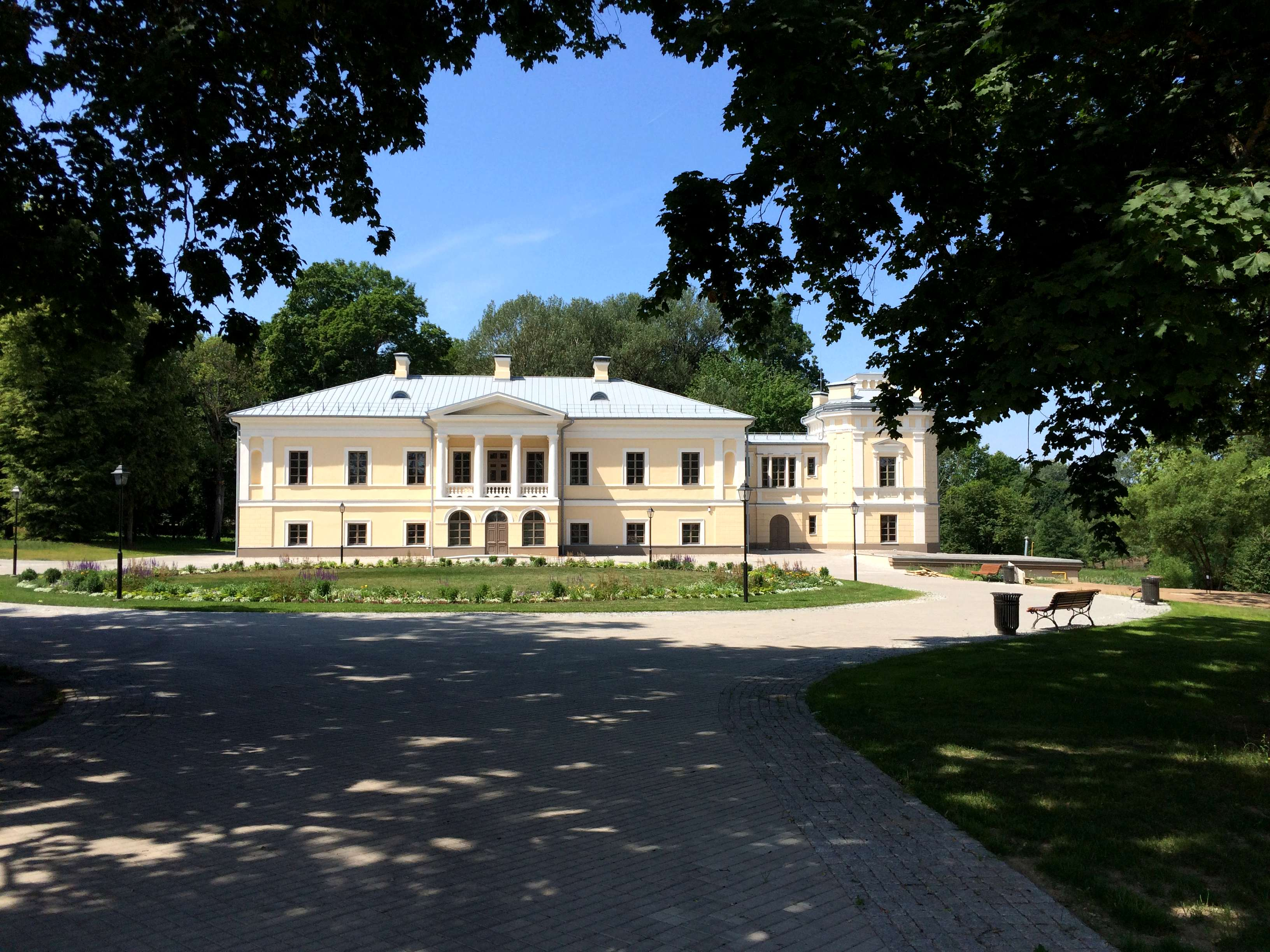
- Jašiūnai Manor

- Coat of arms

- Location of Jašiūnai
- Coordinates: 54°26′20″N 25°18′40″E
- Country: Lithuania
- Ethnographic region: Dzūkija
- County: Vilnius County
- Municipality: Šalčininkai district municipality
- Eldership: Jašiūnai eldership
- Capital of: Jašiūnai eldership
- First mentioned: 1402

Population (2021)
  - Total: 2,383
- Time zone: UTC+2 (EET)
  - Summer (DST): UTC+3 (EEST)

Jašiūnai (Polish: Jaszuny) is a town in Lithuania. It is situated on the Merkys River and an edge of the Rūdninkai Forest. According to the 2001 census, it had population of 1,879. The town's population is primarily Poles (74.5%), with Lithuanians (12.4%) and Russians (8.4%).

== History ==
Year	Population
1882	344
1959	537
1970	367
1979	725
1985	642
2001	1,879
2021	2,383

The town was first mentioned in written sources in 1402. From the 15th to 18th century, the town belonged to the Radziwiłł family.

=== 19th century ===
In 1811 it was bought by Ignacy Baliński, father of historian Michał Baliński. His wife from the Śniadecki family initiated construction of the neoclassical Jašiūnai Manor, designed by architect Karol Podczaszyński. The construction was undertaken between 1824 and 1828. The manor became a cultural center: it was a residence of Jan Śniadecki and Juliusz Słowacki frequently visited by Adam Mickiewicz, Tomasz Zan, Stanisław Bonifacy Jundziłł, Józef Mianowski. This generation of Polish Romantics studied and idealized the history and culture of the former Grand Duchy of Lithuania. These studies had great influence on the worldview of the szlachta of the Vilnius Region: they would identify themselves as Poles while remaining loyal to the Grand Duchy.

Alongside cultural life, the manor owners encouraged small industry: a ceramics workshop (still operating as of 2009), a factory of resin and turpentine, brickyard, paper factory. After the Uprising of 1863 and Baliński's death, Jašiūnai lost its position as a cultural center. The valuable library collection was transported to Poland or lost during the wars.

=== 20th century ===
As part of the Wilno Voivodeship, Jašiūnai belonged to the Second Polish Republic during the interwar period.

==== World War II ====
During World War II, Jews were assembled in a building in the Jašiūnai manor and locked there. On September 25, 1941, the Jews of Jašiūnai were shot, together with those from other villages by the Special Squad of the German Security Police and SD. According to the Jäger Report, 575 Jews were murdered that day: 215 men, 229 women and 131 children. Three Roma people were shot and buried together with the Jews.

== Religion ==
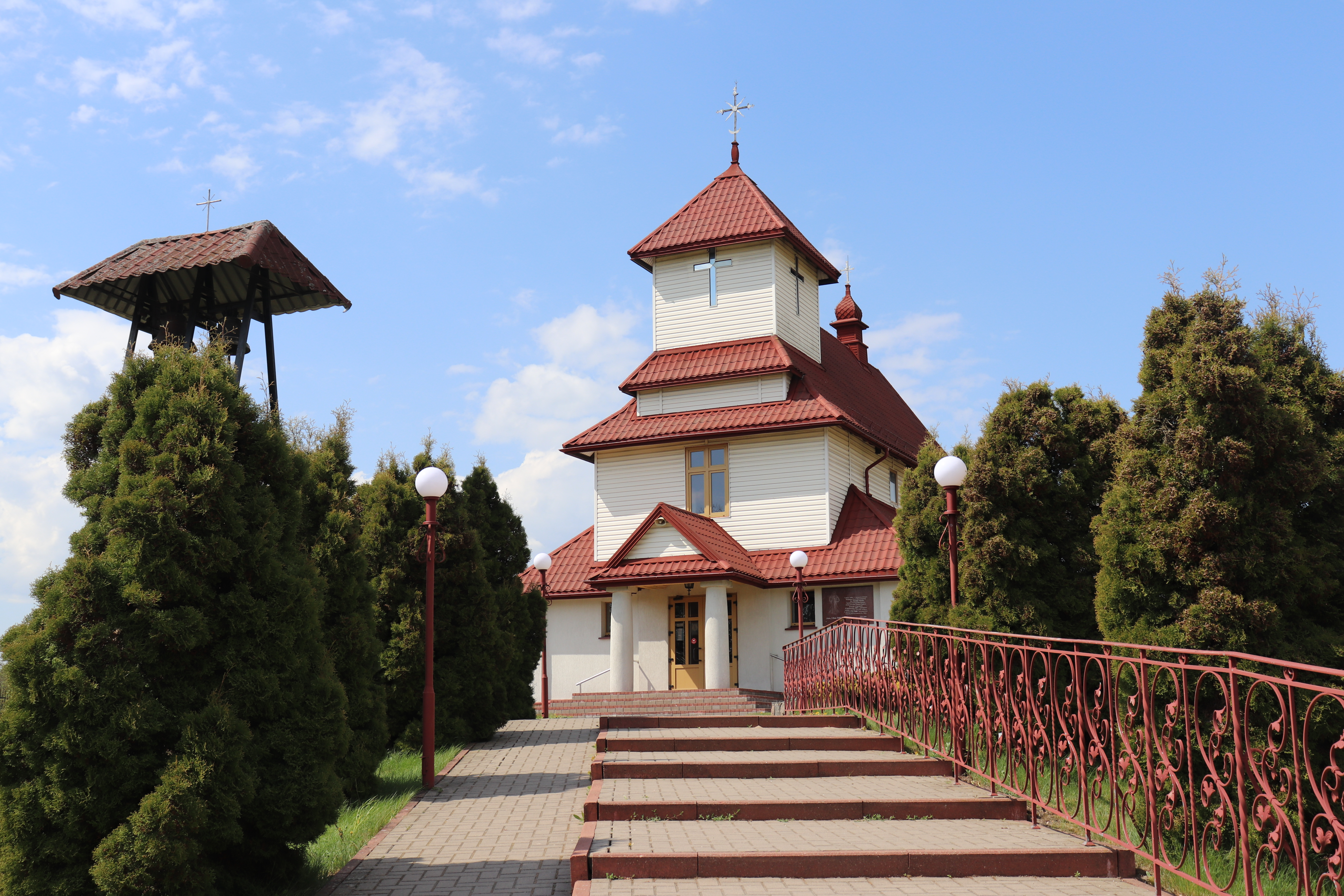
St. Anne's Catholic Church

The first church, named after St. Anna, was built in 1515. When the Radziwiłłs converted to Protestantism, the church was also transformed from a Catholic to a Protestant church. The church was destroyed during the Great Northern War with Sweden (1700–1721). For a long time the town had only a chapel. The current church was built in 1929. It is half-brick, half-wooden church with a single rectangular tower. Its central nave is separated from the aisles by wooden pillars. The wooden ceiling attempts to imitate vaults. The main altar is decorated with a copy of Our Lady of the Gate of Dawn.

There was a synagogue in Jašiūnai containing 800 books in the Jewish language.

== Symbols ==
In 2001 the town received its coats of arms, designed by Arvydas Každailis. The coat of arms depict a silver column in a red shield with two golden stars on each side. The column represents classical architecture and the manor. It also carries symbolical meaning of strength and power. The two stars are dedicated to the two families prominent in town's history – Balińskis and Śniadeckis.
