= Chagin =

Chagin (Russian: Чагин) is a Russian masculine surname, its feminine counterpart is Chagina. Notable people with the surname include:

- Nikolai Chagin (1823–1909), Russian architect
- Vladimir Chagin (born 1970), Russian rally raid driver
