= Church of St. Paraskeva, Vilnius =

Church building in Vilnius, Lithuania

Coordinates: 54°40′51″N 25°17′21″E

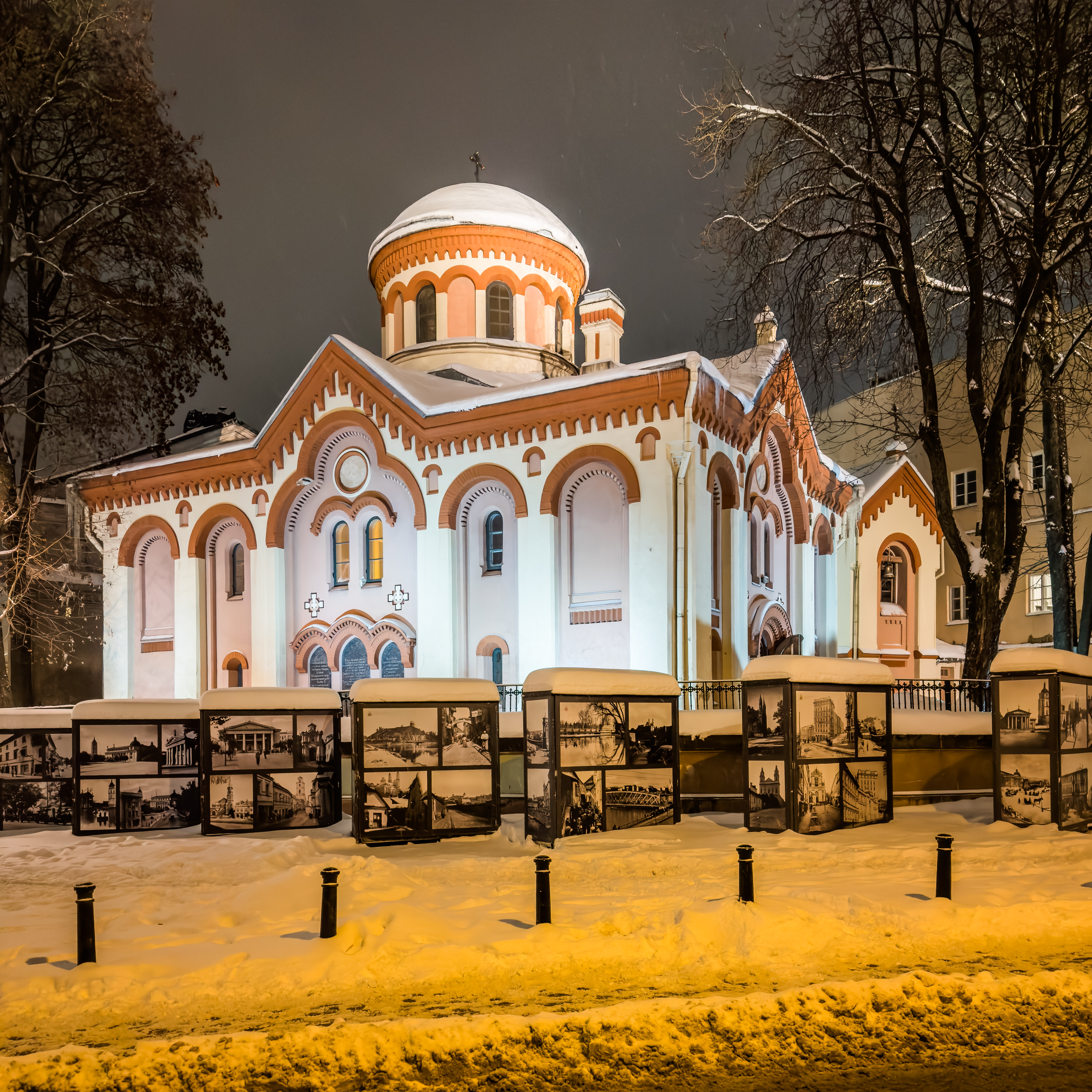
Church of St. Paraskeva

St. Paraskeva Church (Lithuanian: Vilniaus Šv. kankinės Paraskevės cerkvė; Russian: Пятницкая церковь, romanized: Pyatnitskaya tserkov') is the oldest Eastern Orthodox church in Lithuania, located in the capital Vilnius, belonging to the Russian Orthodox Diocese of Lithuania.

The first Orthodox church of St. Paraskeva was constructed in 1345 at the request of Grand Duke Algirdas's first wife, Maria Yaroslavna of Vitebsk, who was subsequently buried there in 1346. According to tradition, the church was built on the site of a temple to the pagan god, Ragutis. This church was completely destroyed by fire in 1557 and rebuilt three years later, but burned down again in 1611. Although ruined, it was given to the local Eastern Catholics. In 1655, it was given back to the Orthodox Church by the occupying Muscovite troops and renovated.

During the Great Northern War, in 1705, with Vilnius invaded and pillaged by the Muscovite army, the church was visited by the Russian tsar Peter I of Russia, who prayed there for the military victory. During the same service, Abram Petrovich Gannibal was baptised, with the tsar serving as the godfather. Three years later, the victorious tsar decided to grant some of the conquered Swedish flags to St. Paraskeva's church.

Before 1870

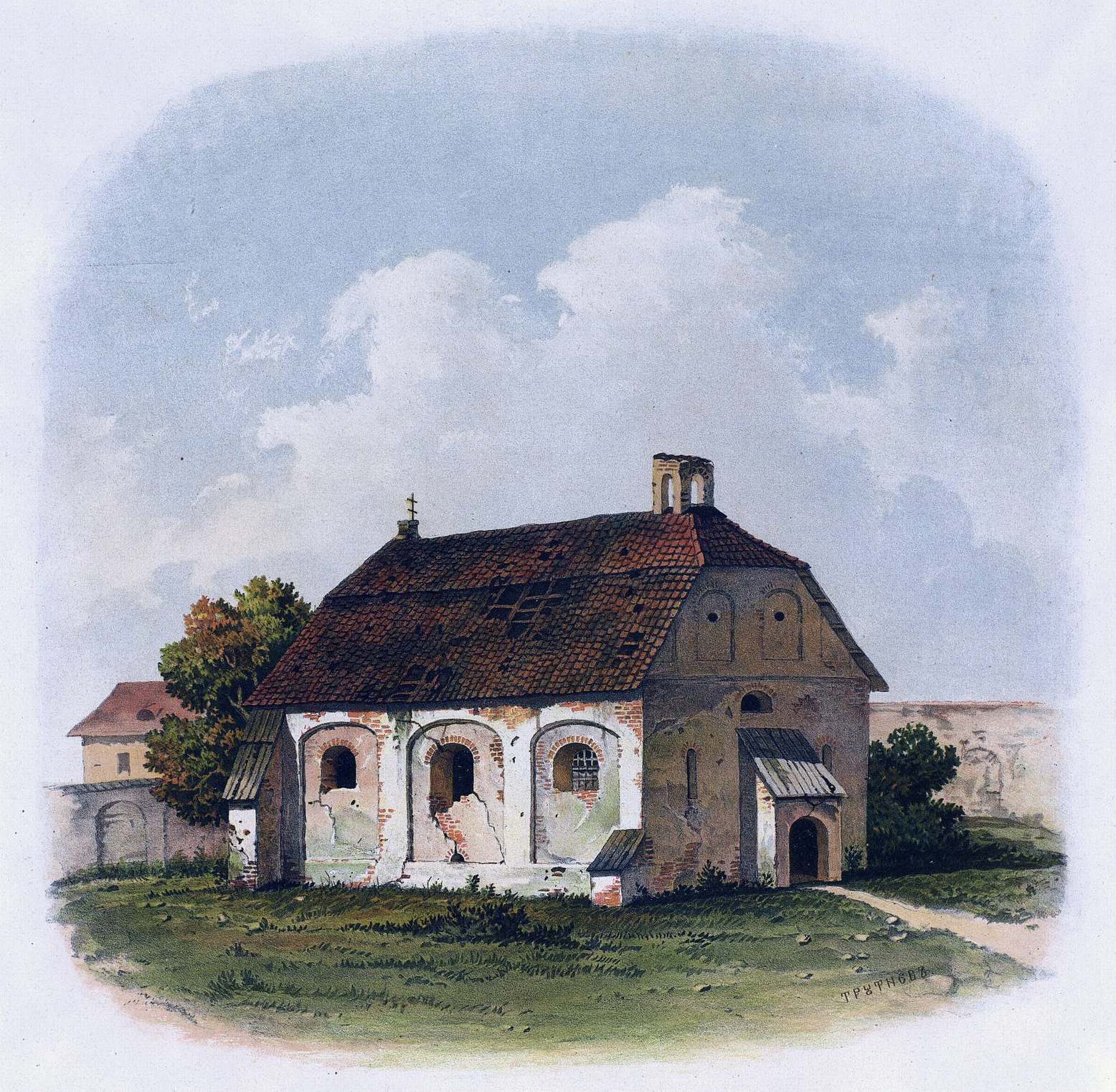
1807

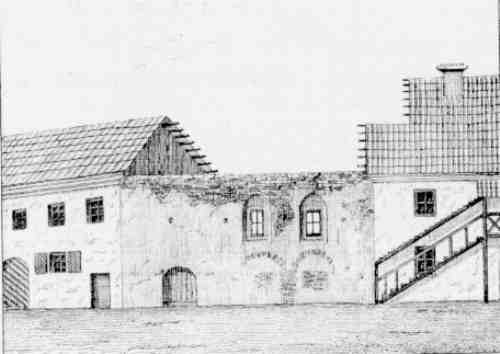
1820

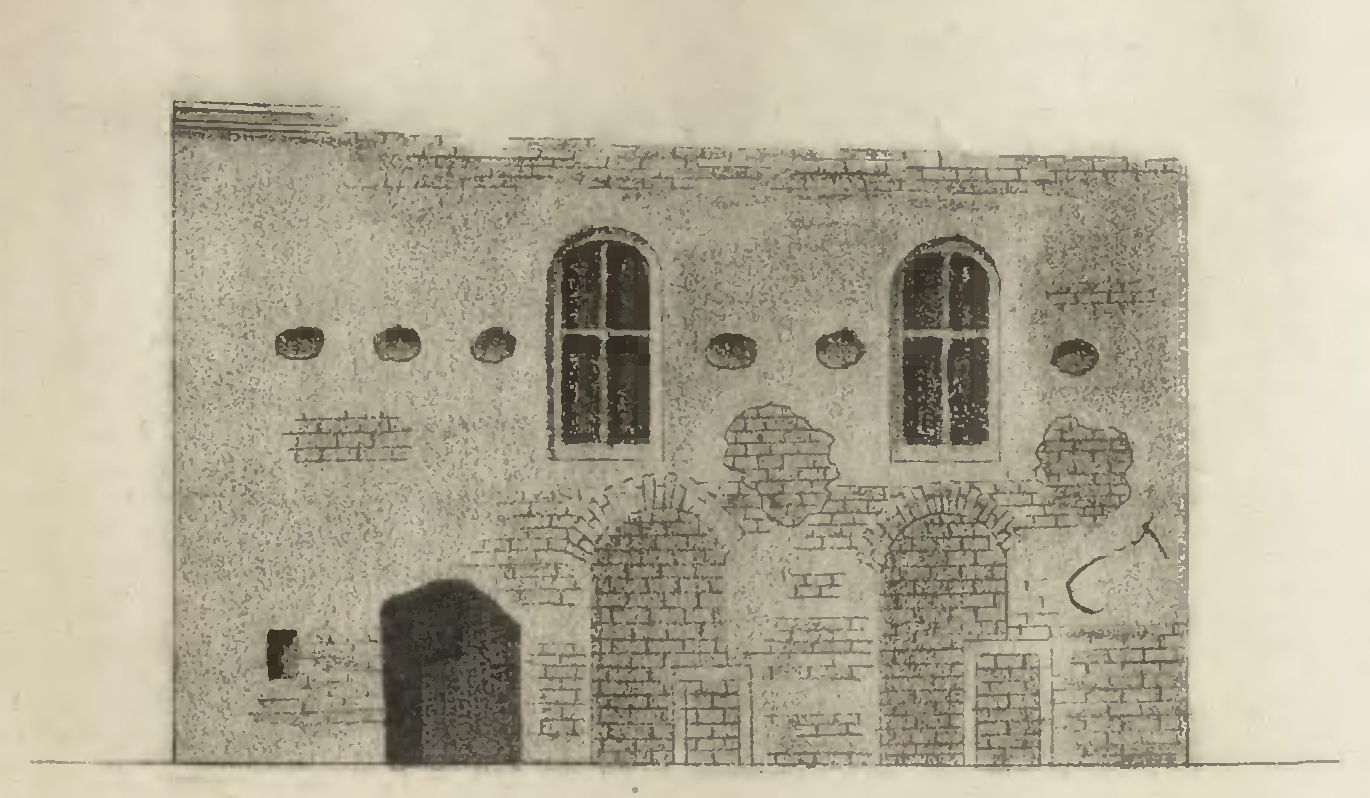
1869

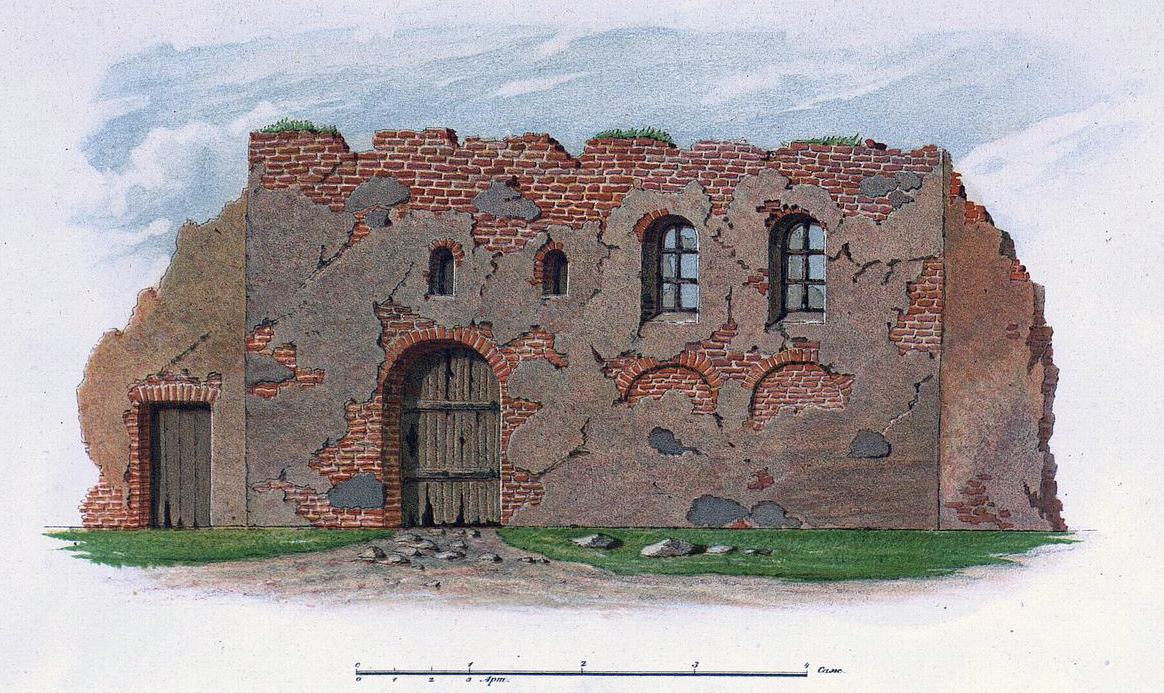
1864

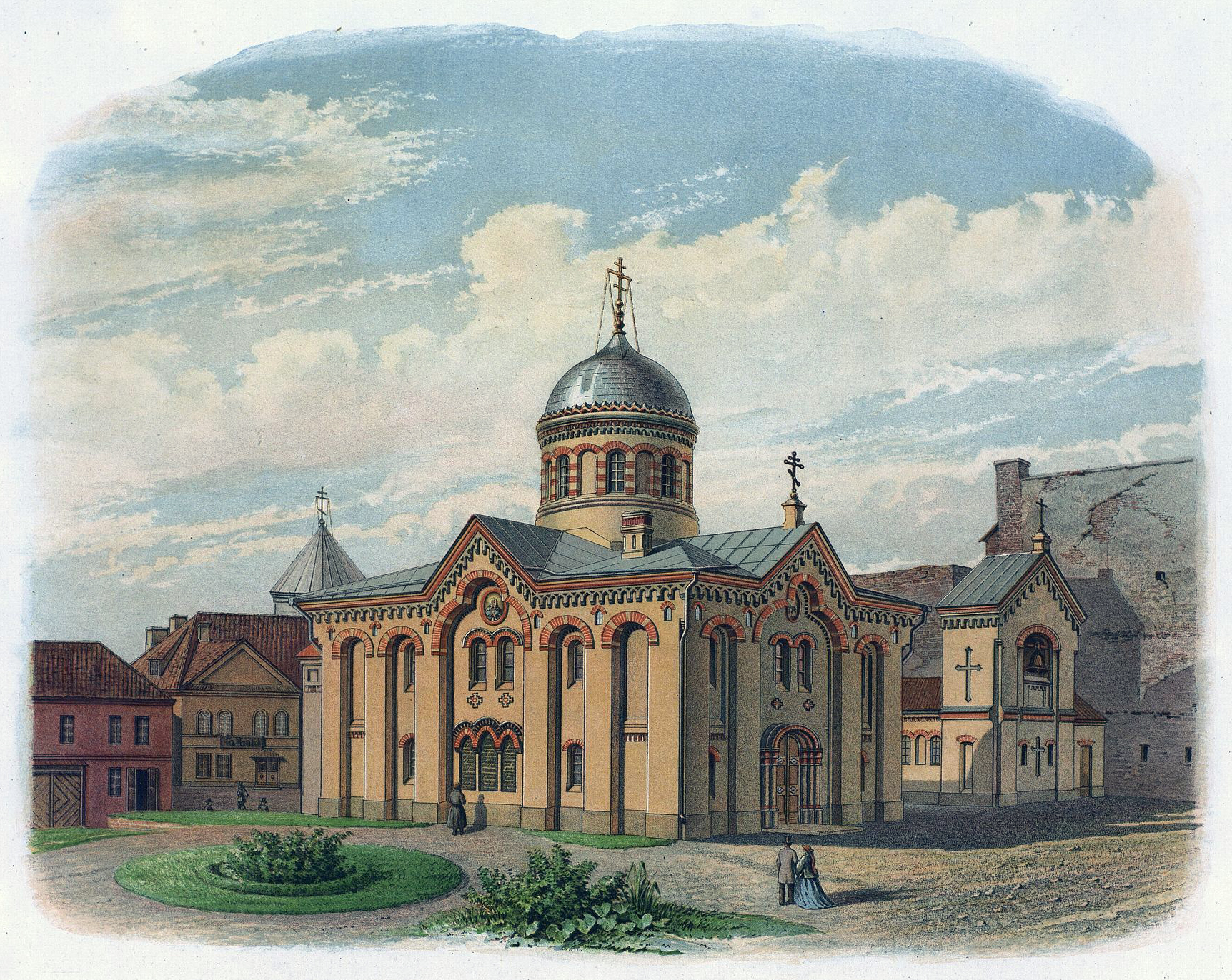
Church in 1870. Painting by Ivan Trutnev.

In 1748, the building was again destroyed by fire and rebuilt in 1795. However, it stood closed during the following forty years, slowly falling into decline. In 1864, on the orders of the Russian local government, it was rebuilt and enlarged in Neo-Byzantine style by Nikolay Chagin.

The church was devastated during the World War II. Although it was renovated again, the Stalinist government didn't allow the Russian Orthodox Church to start holding its services there. At first, a Museum of Atheism was to be opened there, but in the end the church was turned into a gallery of Lithuanian folk art. The church was given back to the Orthodox Church only in 1990 and reconsecrated by Metropolitan Chrysostom the following year. Since then it has been an auxiliary church of the Cathedral of the Theotokos.

== See also ==
- Neo-Byzantine architecture in the Russian Empire

== Sources ==
- G. Shlevis, Православные храмы Литвы, Vilnius 2006
