= Evangelical Reformed Church, Vilnius =

Calvinist church in Vilnius, Lithuania

Evangelical Reformed Church Evangelikų reformatų bažnyčia
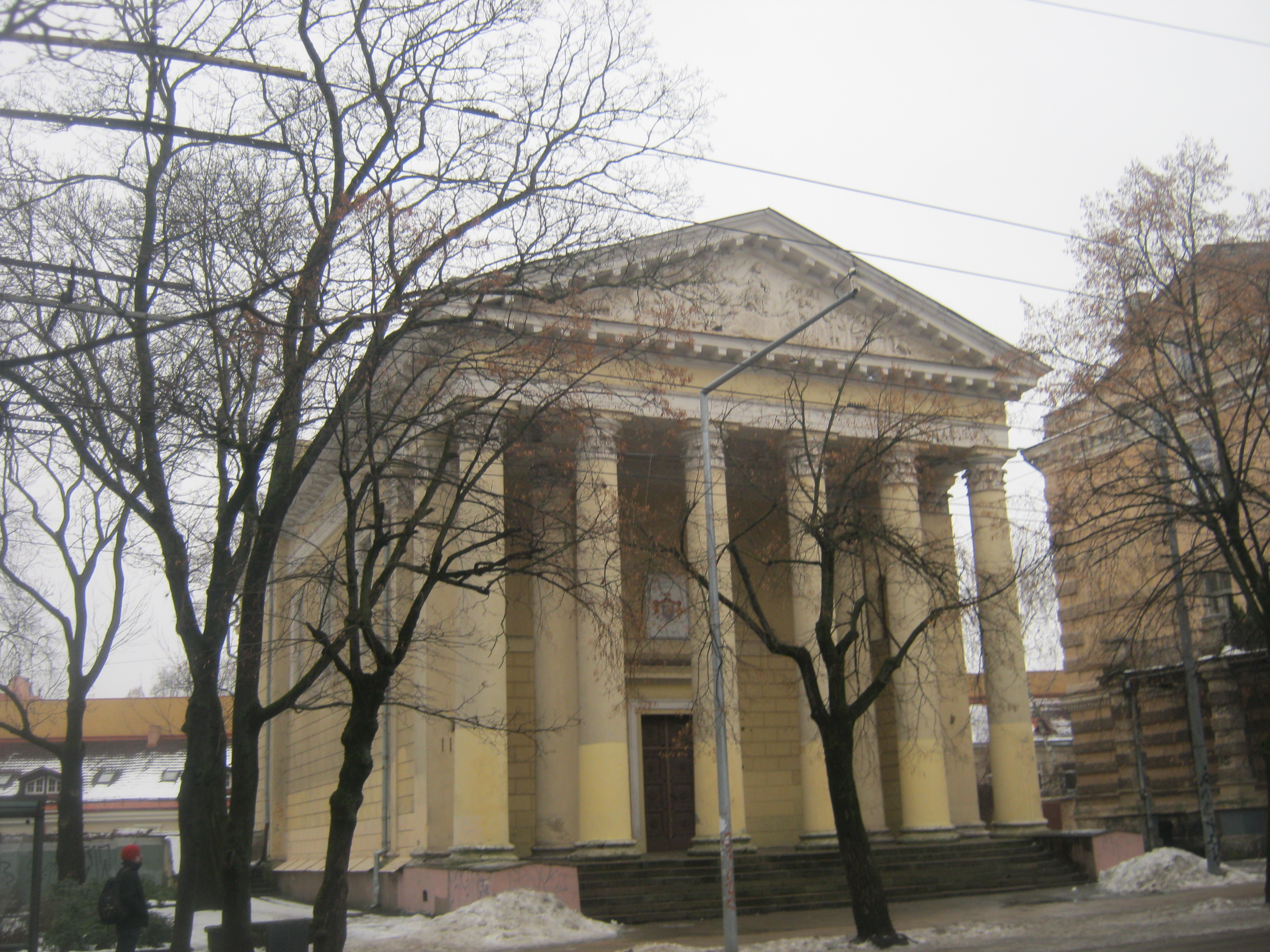
- Façade of the church in 2013

Religion
- Affiliation: Continental Reformed Protestantism
- District: Vilnius Old Town
- Ecclesiastical or organizational status: Used as a church
- Leadership: Lithuanian Evangelical Reformed Church

Location
- Location: Vilnius, Lithuania
- Interactive map of Evangelical Reformed Church; Evangelikų reformatų bažnyčia
- Coordinates: 54°40′52.85″N 25°16′40.4″E

Architecture
- Type: Church
- Style: Classicism
- Completed: 1835
- Materials: Plastered masonry

Website
- Vilniaus parapija

Evangelical Reformed Church (Lithuanian: Evangelikų reformatų bažnyčia) is a Continental Reformed Protestantic church in the Vilnius Old Town which was built in 1830–1835 according to a project of Karol Podczaszyński. In 2008 a new organ was installed in the church.

Following a restoration, three sculptures on the main façade were reinstalled in 2022.

== Gallery ==
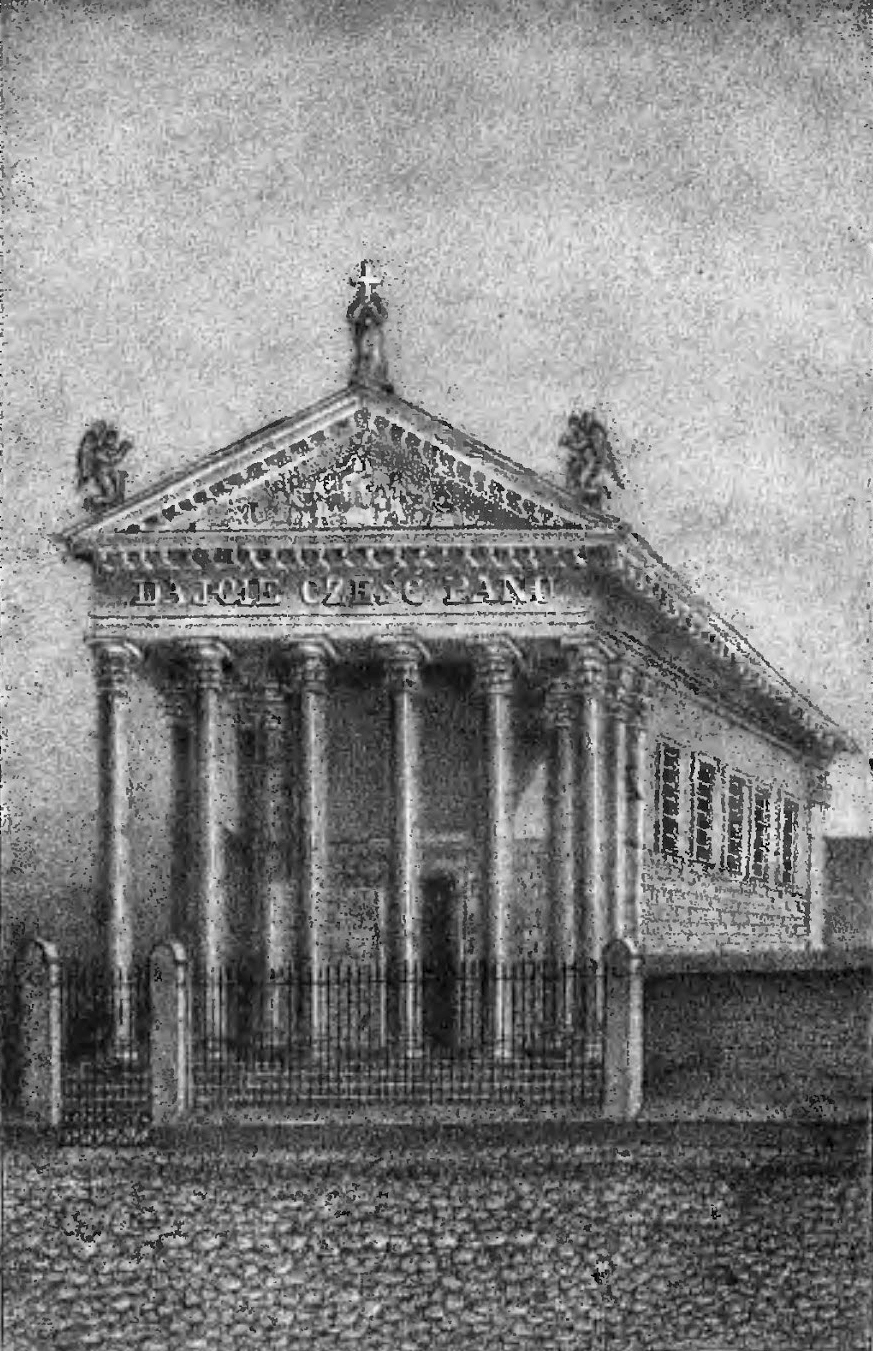
Exterior of the church in 1835

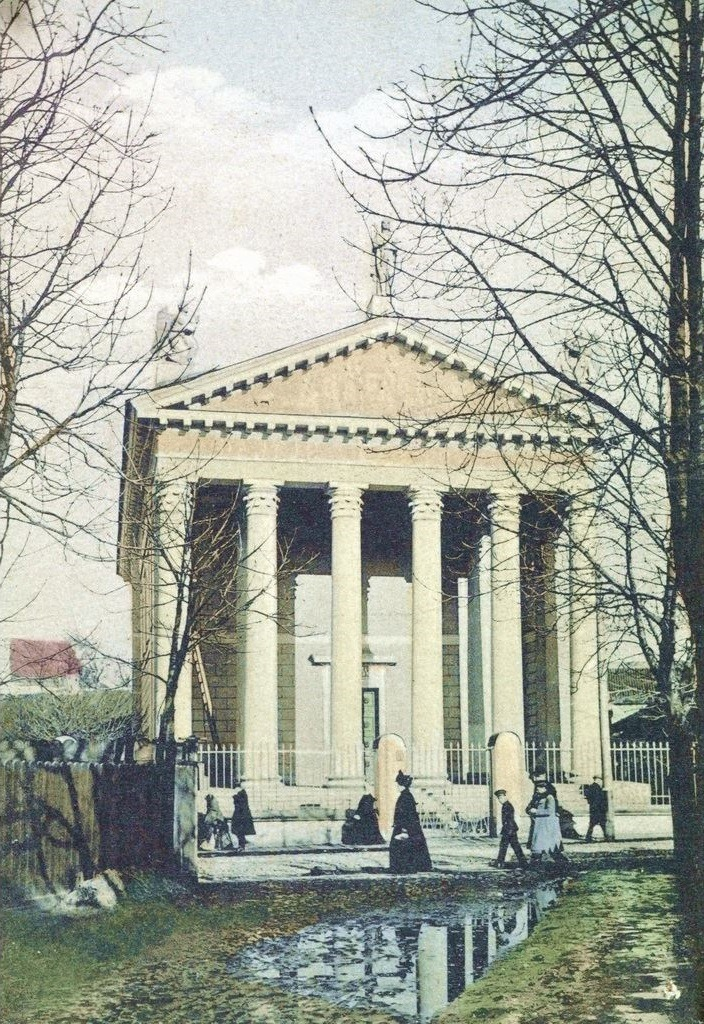
Exterior of the church in the early 20th century

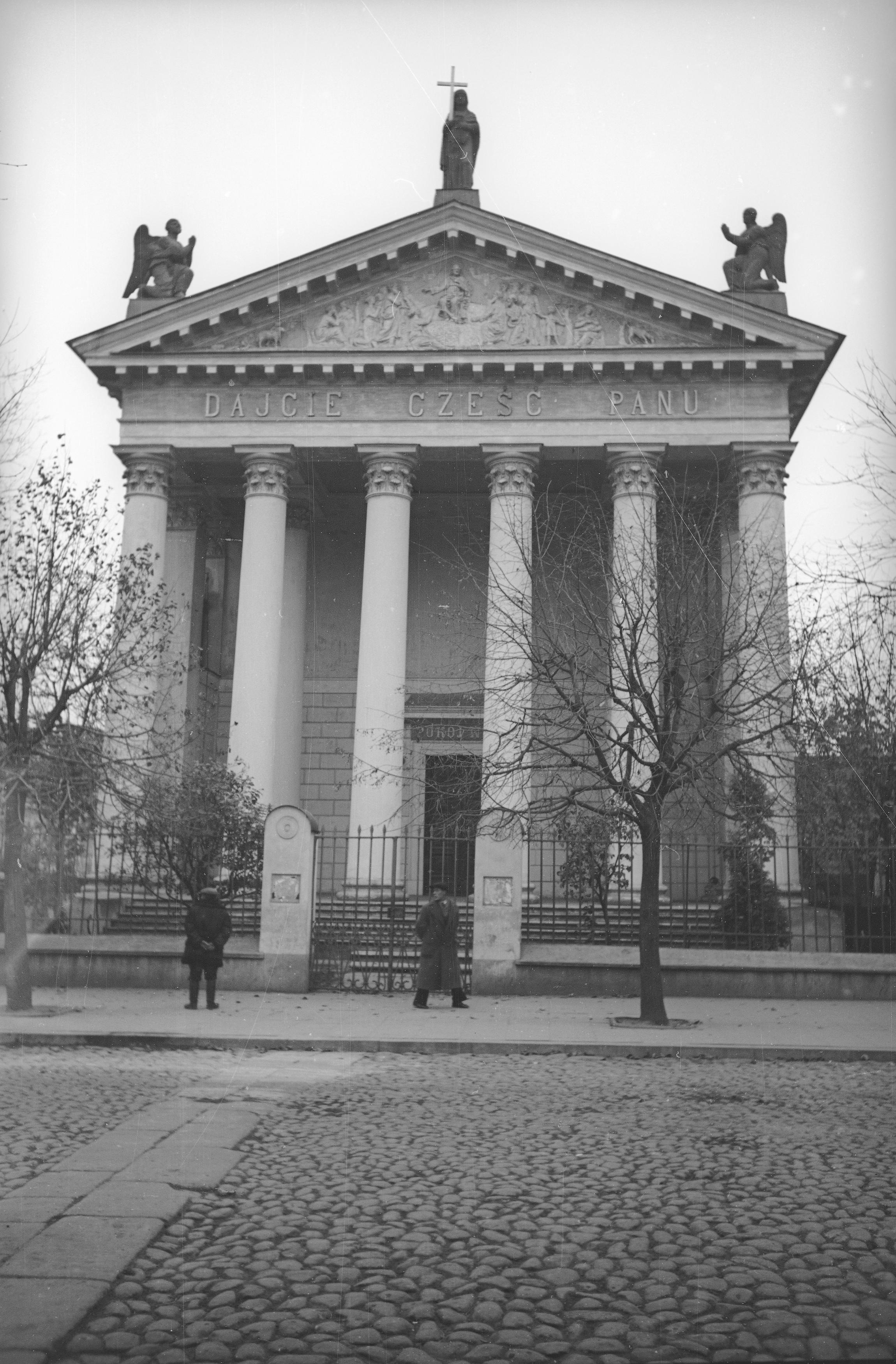
Exterior of the church in 1937

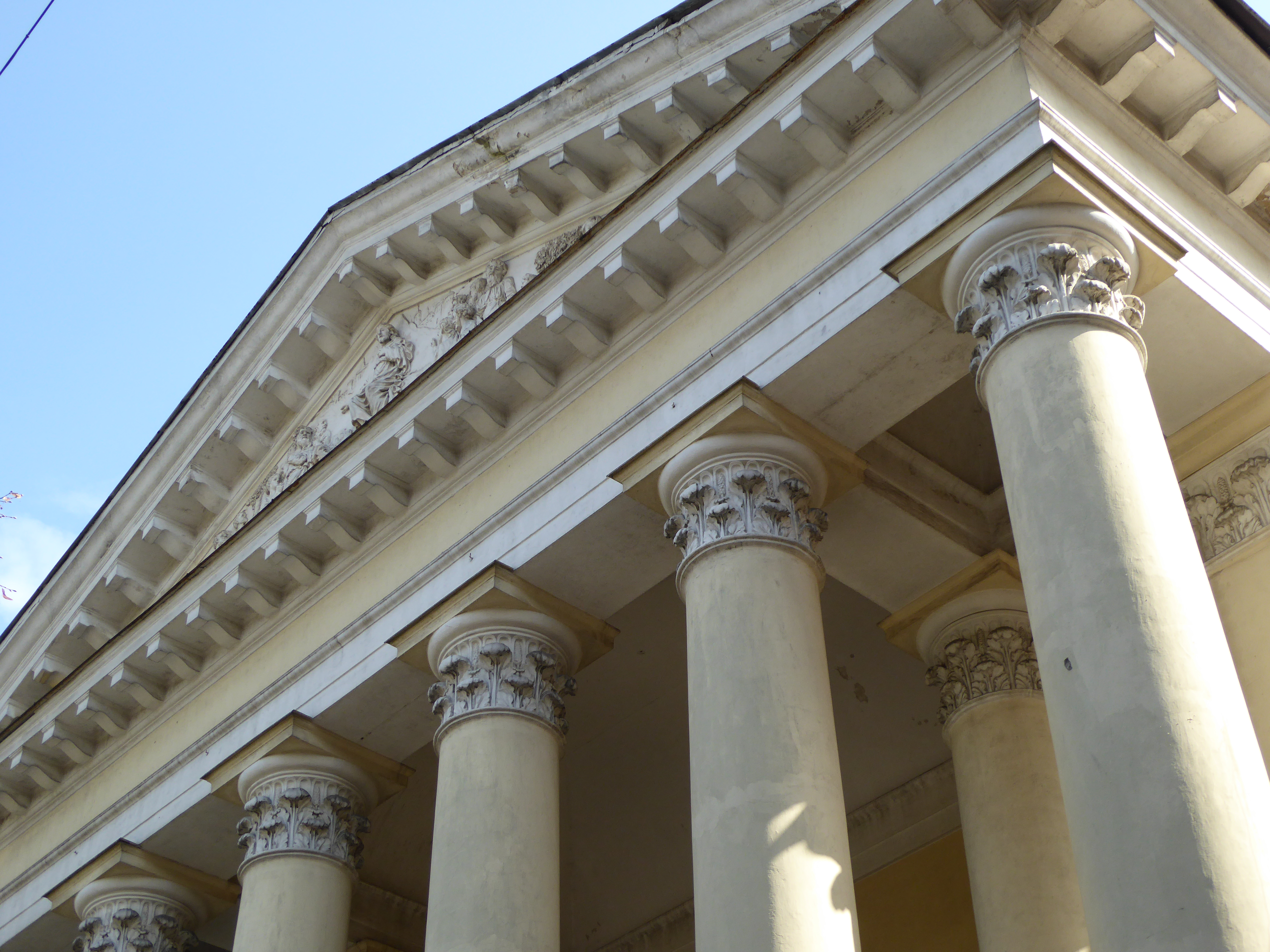
Details of the façade

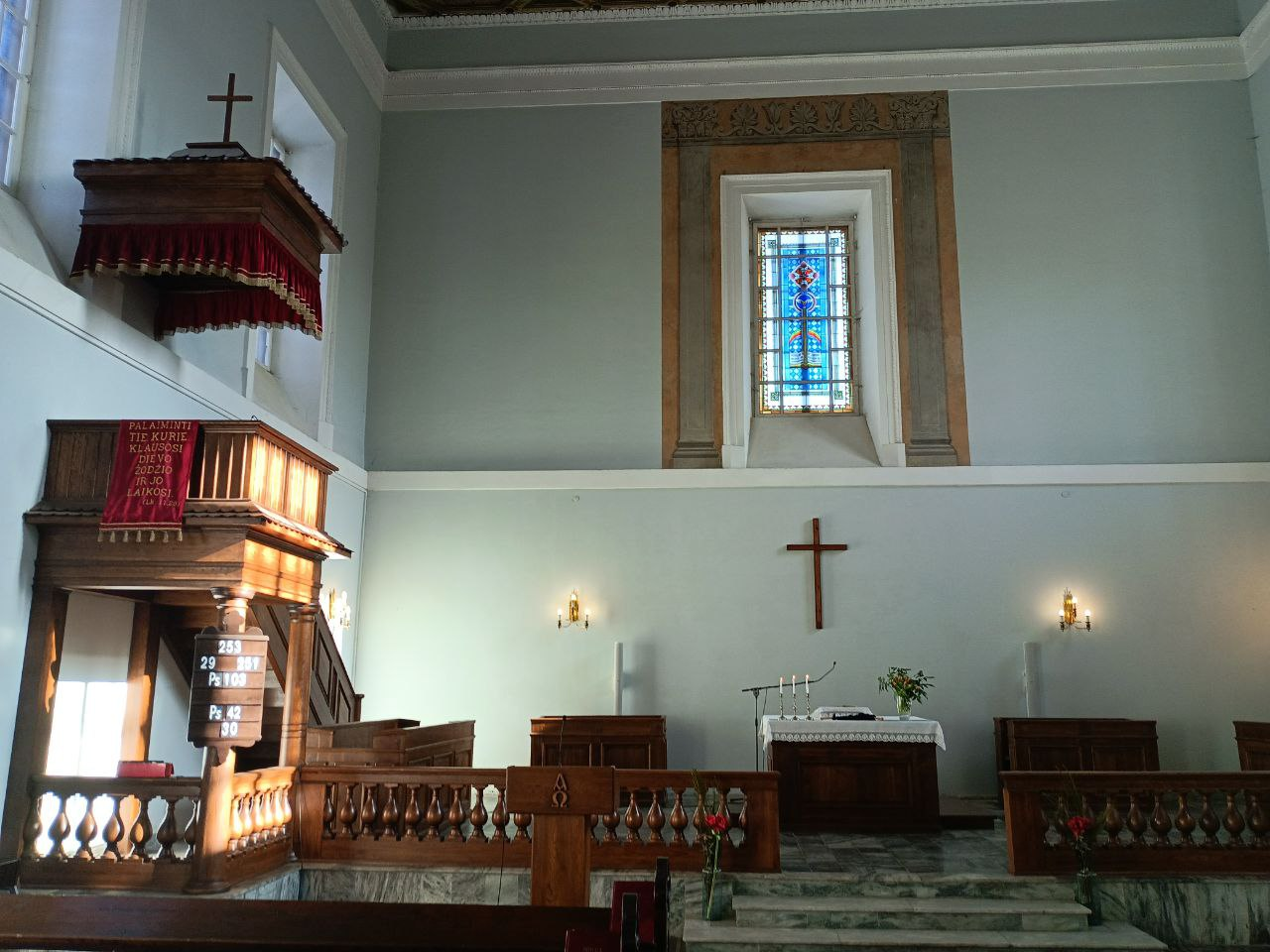
Interior of the church in 2025
