= Cathedral of the Theotokos, Vilnius =

Eastern Orthodox cathedral in Vilnius, Lithuania

Coordinates: 54.681°N 25.292°E

- Vilniaus Dievo Motinos Ėmimo į Dangų katedra
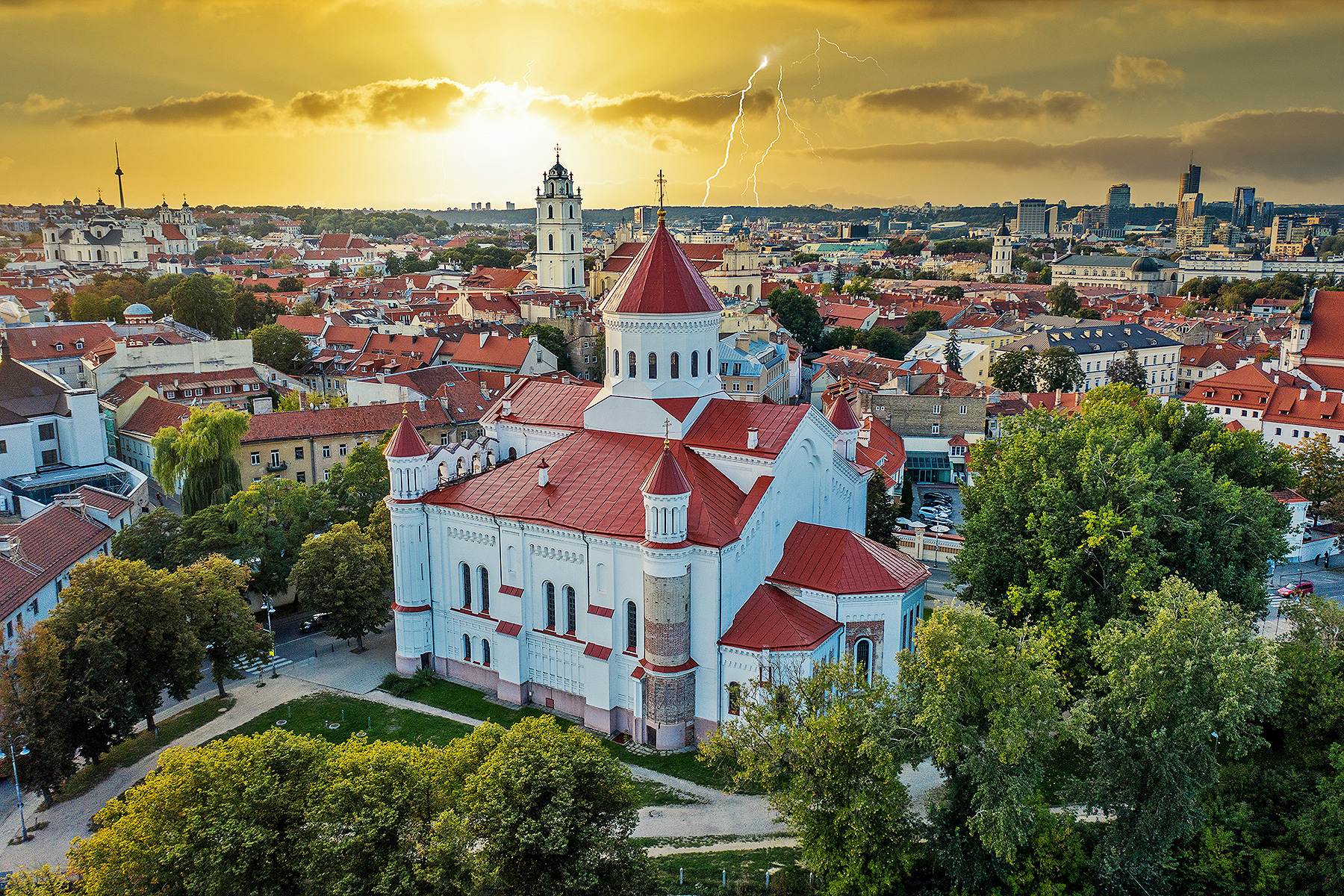
- Western façade of the cathedral
- Click on the map for a fullscreen view
- Location: Vilnius
- Country: Lithuania
- Language(s): Lithuanian, Russian
- Denomination: Eastern Orthodox Church

History
- Status: Active
- Dedication: Theotokos

Architecture
- Style: Byzantine
- Completed: 1346

Specifications
- Height: 49 metres (161 ft)

UNESCO World Heritage Site
- Official name: Vilnius Old Town
- Type: Cultural
- Criteria: Cultural: (ii), (iv)
- Designated: 1994
- Reference no.: 541
- UNESCO region: Europe

The Cathedral of the Theotokos in Vilnius (Note: Lithuanian: Vilniaus Dievo Motinos Ėmimo į Dangų katedra; Russian: Пречи́стенский кафедра́льный собо́р, romanized: Prechístenskiy kafedrál'nyy sobór) is the episcopal see of the Russian Orthodox Diocese of Lithuania.

Between 1415 and 1795, it was the mother church of the Ruthenian Orthodox Church and the Ruthenian Uniate Church (following the 1596 Union of Brest) within the Grand Duchy of Lithuania and then the Polish–Lithuanian Commonwealth.

== History ==
=== 14–18th centuries ===
The cathedral was built during the reign of the Grand Duke of Lithuania Algirdas for his Orthodox second wife Uliana of Tver in 1346. It was constructed by Kievan architects with the blessing of Saint Alexius, Metropolitan of Kiev and all Rus', in 1348.

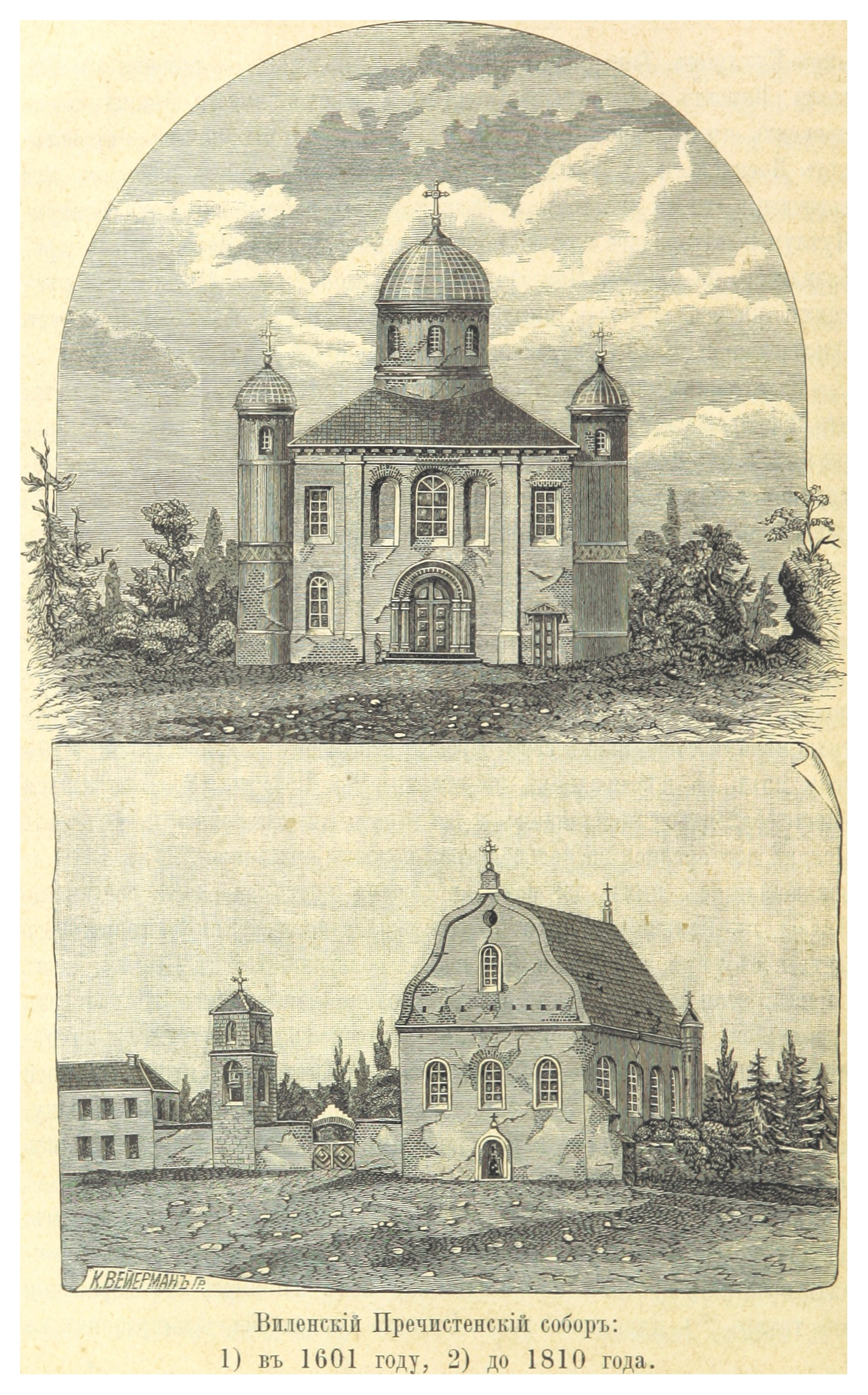
Cathedral of the Theotokos: until 1601 (top), until 1810.

The Cathedral of the Theotokos is one of the most ancient churches of Vilnius, built before the christianization of Lithuania when the Grand Duchy of Lithuania was the last pagan state in Europe. It became an important spiritual centre for the growing Christian population of the Duchy. The Lithuanian Grand Duchess Helena of Moscow, wife of the Lithuanian Grand Duke Alexander Jagiellon and daughter of the Muscovian Grand Duke Ivan III, was buried at the Cathedral of the Theotokos in Vilnius.

After the conversion of Lithuania to Roman Catholicism, the Orthodox cathedral was protected by princes Konstanty Ostrogski and Konstanty Wasyl Ostrogski, who restored it after the collapse of the dome in 1506. After their deaths, the cathedral was taken over by the Uniate Catholic church in 1609 and was rebuilt in a style typical of the region.

In 1748, the cathedral was abandoned after a major fire and the building was used for various other purposes. It was reconstructed in the Baroque style in 1785. The cathedral was once again destroyed by the Russian army during the Kościuszko Uprising.

=== 19–20th centuries ===
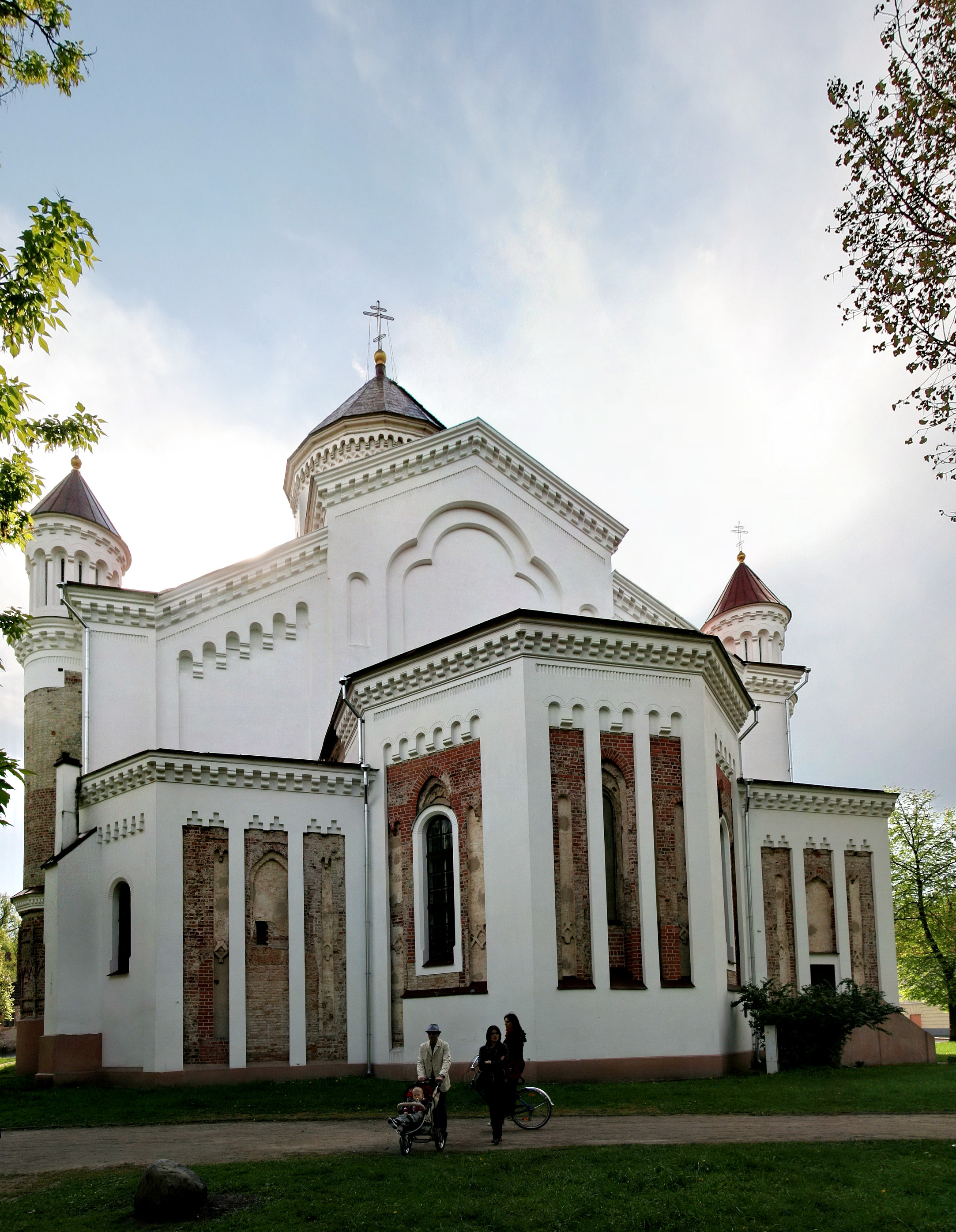
Cathedral of the Theotokos

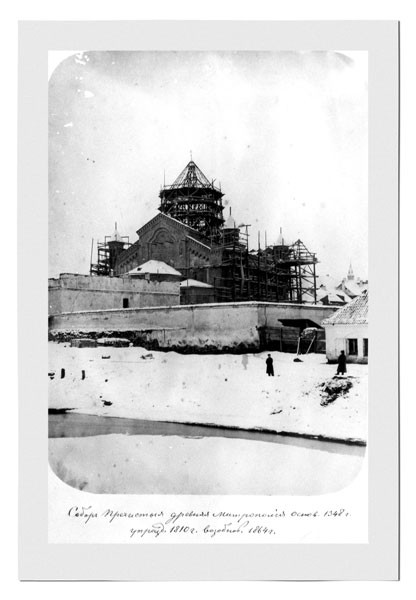
Reconstruction of the Cathedral of the Theotokos, 1865–1868. A photograph taken during the reconstruction by Chagin.

In 1808, a local prelate sold the neglected building to the Vilnius University, which had the building thoroughly modernised in 1822 in the Neoclassical style by Karol Podczaszyński. After that, the building hosted an anatomical theatre, library and other university facilities for half a century.

The old cathedral was confiscated and transferred to the Russian Orthodox Church on the initiative of count Mikhail Nikolayevich Muravyov and his brother during the Russification campaign. The Russian architect Nikolai Chagin was responsible for its reconstruction from 1865 until 1868 in a style imitating medieval Georgian architecture.

St. Tikhon (Belavin), then Archbishop of Vilnius, presided over the cathedral and Orthodox Christians of Lithuania between 1913 and the occupation of Lithuania by the German troops in 1915. Most of the Russian Orthodox clergy left with the retreating Russian army.

The cathedral of the Theotokos was damaged during the Second World War but was restored in 1948, although its renovations were not completed until 1957. Today the cathedral belongs to the Russian Orthodox Church and was once again renovated in 1998. Its services are attended mostly by ethnic Russian and Belarusian residents of Vilnius.

== Gallery ==
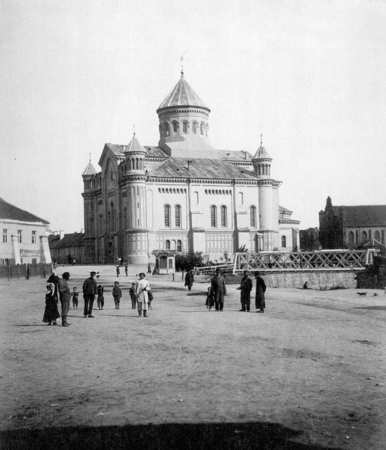
Cathedral of the Theotokos, 1877.

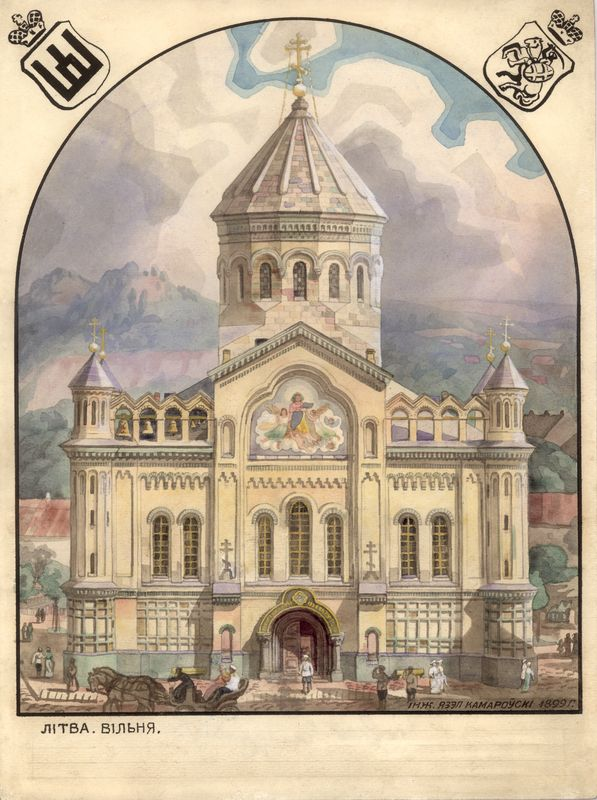
Cathedral of the Theotokos by Juozas Kamarauskas with Vytis and Columns of Gediminas 1899.

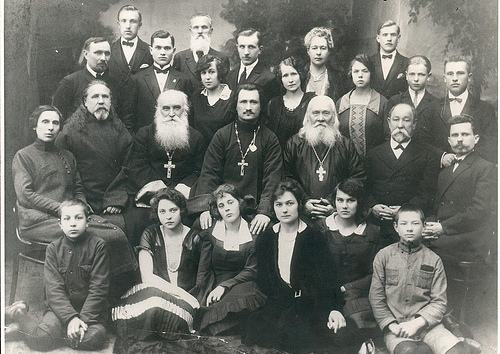
Choir of the Cathedral of the Theotokos, 1926. Sitting of the right edge — Ryhor Šyrma, Belarusian folklorist.

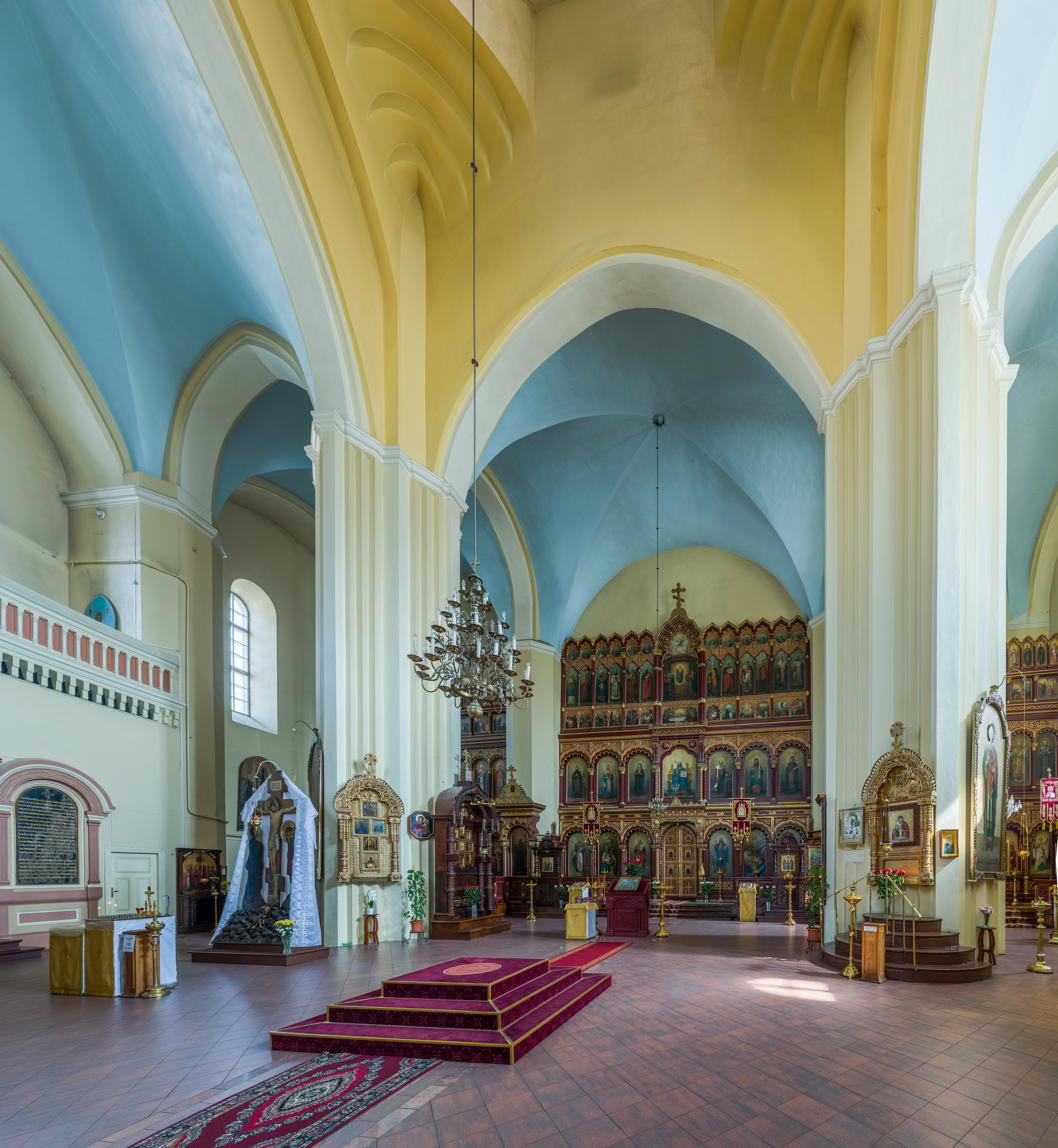
Interior

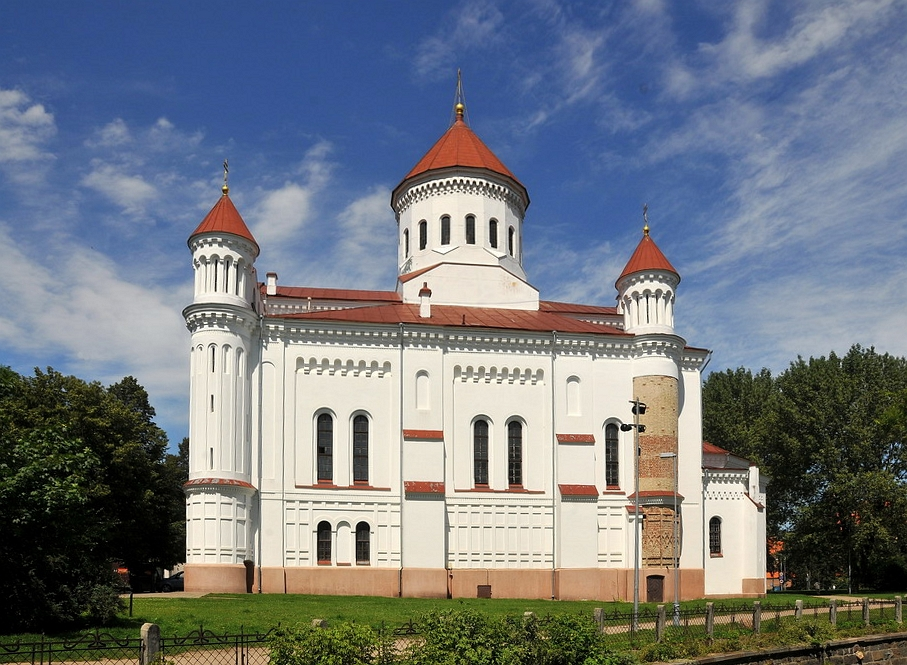

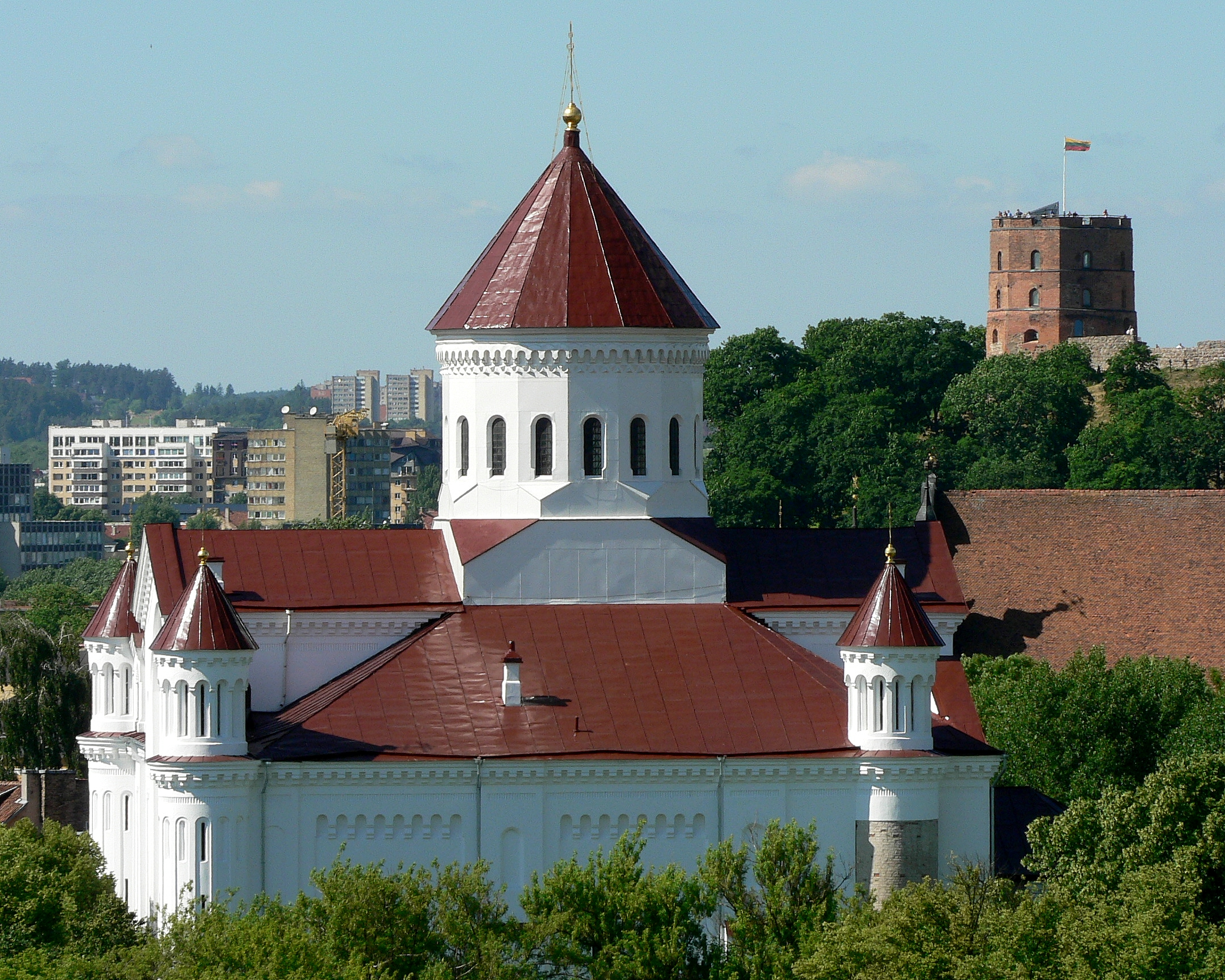
Cathedral of the Theotokos and Gediminas' Tower.

== See also ==
- Church of St. Paraskeva, Vilnius
- Orthodox Church of the Holy Spirit, Vilnius

== Bibliography ==
- (in Russian) Вильнюсский Пречистенский кафедральный собор. Официальный сайт собора Успения Пресвятой Богородицы, г. Вильнюс. (Official website.)
- (in Russian) Detailed history of the cathedral
