= Oskar Sosnowski =

Polish architect

- Born: 6 November 1880; Saint Petersburg, Russia
- Died: 24 September 1939 (aged 58); Warsaw, Poland
- Occupation: Architect

Oskar Sosnowski (6 November 1880 – 24 September 1939) was a leading Polish architect and art conservator and restorer of monuments during the period between World War I and World War II.

== Biography ==
Sosnowski received his education at a Russian polytechnic in Warsaw, in the Engineering and Construction Faculty Department.

In the fall of 1918, the recently renovated building of the Faculty of Architecture at the Warsaw University of Technology (Warsaw Polytechnic) was occupied by the Bolshevik army, causing many Polish students enlisted to drive them out. Following this brief interruption, new professors arrived at the faculty, including Sosnowski, who took the post of the chair of Polish Architecture Division. In 1919, he became a professor at the Warsaw Polytechnic. In 1922, he initiated the establishment of the Association of Polish City Planners. In 1929, he founded the Department of Architecture of Poland at Warsaw Polytechnic.

Sosnowski's projects were based on traditional historical forms, but he used new materials as reinforced concrete. He also developed proposals for communities that for the first time applied a new urban form of building around a lake or other feature.

Sosnowski was one of the greatest Polish architects of the period that developed the Professors' Quarter in Warsaw. A unique complex of 21 houses built in the Powiśle district of Warsaw (within the triangular area delineated by the Górnośląska, Myśliwiecka, and Hoene-Wrońskiego streets). They were built between 1923 and 1926 by professors at Warsaw Polytechnic's Faculty of Architecture, with the idea for each architect designs a house for himself. The houses have been preserved in an almost perfect condition and are now a treasured monument of architecture and urban planning.

Sosnowski was quite interested in Jewish culture, and he began a project to inventory synagogues in Poland during the 1920s. Of especial importance is the documentation, measured drawings and photographs made in the period between the First and Second World Wars by the Department of Polish Architecture of the Polytechnic of Warsaw, and in particular, the efforts of Professor Sosnowski and other architects, art historians and students which he led, has provided a unique collection of documentation Sosnowski, photographer and art historian Szymon Zajczyk, and Warsaw Polytechnic students documented these wooden structures through architectural drawings, replica paintings, and photographs. Recognizing the historical importance and artistic value of this architecture and fearing its impending destruction with the rise of anti-Semitism in Eastern Europe, this team compiled extensive data and produced architectural drawings, color and detail studies and photographs of many synagogues. Much of this project was destroyed during World War II but a substantial amount survived. Today the documentation is all that remain of the wooden synagogues of Poland.

He also prepared an extensive database documenting of other buildings and design elements that has now become part of the work in preserving the European Wooden Churches Heritage. The collection includes drawings and photographs concerning monumental as well as vernacular architecture. It was rescued during the burning of Warsaw by the Nazis and the collection was continued after war, so that it consists now more than 35 thousand drawings – plans, sections, facades, and details along with thousands of photographs, and is probably the biggest archive of this kind in Poland.

Work by Sosnowski within the Polish Architecture Division in the Department of Architecture was conducted in the following areas: folk art and rural construction, the history of art, inventory measurements, town planning, painting, and history of fortifications, as well as in studios dealing with interiors and equipment, liturgical (sacral) art, Jewish art, and garden architecture. The amassed collections of measurements, photographs, and slides totaled thousands, and the number of publications exceeded twenty.

== Wounded ==
Sosnowski was wounded by German soldiers in the School of Architecture building's courtyard while trying save the archives containing the surveys of Polish historic buildings (the preserved documents provided the information to reconstruct the Warsaw Old Town after the war). The Germans then killed or interred 41 professors, including Sosnowski, and the university soon became an important point of resistance during the 1944 uprising against the Germans.

== European Influences? ==
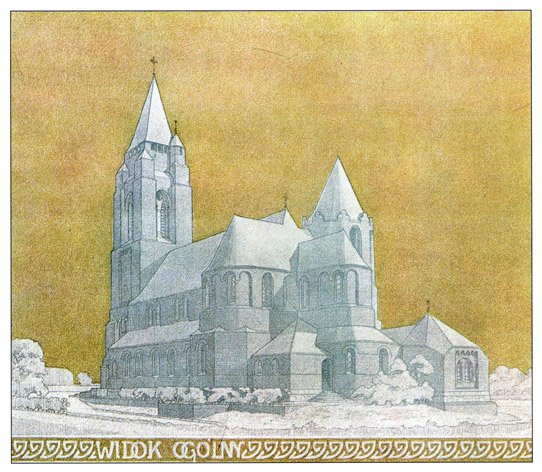
Sosnowski's design for the Church of the Immaculate Conception (Sw.Jakuba), Warsaw

Although some basic information on historical Polish architecture is now more easily available, for the Western connoisseur it is still very largely a terra incognita. This seems particularly disappointing when one considers the work of a number of designers at the threshold of 20th century modernism. How many lavish books have there been devoted, during the last 50 years, to masters such as Victor Horta, Charles Voysey or Peter Behrens? But to find a broader appreciation of Sosnowski’s or Jan Koszczyc-Witkiewicz’s work, let alone adequate illustrations, is still virtually impossible for a non-Polish audience. The reasons for this lacunae are manifold. Firstly, for Western architectural historians, particularly German-language ones, such as Nikolaus Pevsner, who began his writings on the history of Modern architecture and design in the early 1930s, a Polish work worth noting could simply not be imagined. Polish art historians and their publishers have been very slow to produce thorough investigations and adequately illustrated books about those masters, and even what has been brought out during the last few years still appears to be destined entirely for internal consumption. A comprehensive and discerning book on Polish 20th-century architecture placed into a general Western context is still badly wanting.

Here the aim is to signal some of the broader issues in the work of Oskar Sosnowski, arguably Poland’s most eminent designer in the period 1910-1940. What makes the task rather difficult is that neither the architect himself, nor Polish architectural critics of the time supplied us with much explanatory discourse.

Sosnowski’s professed aim early on was to create a new ‘old’ national style, as did many of his colleagues in Poland and in most other countries. German writers and architects had adopted a primitivist approach to village architecture from the 1890s and conceivably Sosnowski might have seen the publications advocating a ‘folkart’ style for rural churches by the Berlin architect and publicist Oskar Hossfeld (e.g.in his Stadt und Landkirchen, Berlin Ernst 1905 and later eds.; many of his churches are found in the former Prussian parts of Poland).

The question whether Sosnowski ever arrived at a new (or old) national style cannot be answered here. But in any case, his Warsaw church (Church of the Immaculate Conception (Sw.Jakuba) of 1909 shows an astonishing range in its formal language, from the immense spatial subtlety and complexity of the circular formations of the East end, to the deliberately brutal treatment of the brickwork in the massive tower. The latter points directly to his next phase of numerous fiercely experimental projects of c.1912-1915, which can only be labelled as a primitivist kind of expressionism, and as such we may see them as Hans Poelzig avant-la-lettre. Indeed, the latter’s work, from his early designs in Silesia to his late buildings in Berlin, forms the closest parallel to Sosnowski's work. Mutual influences? unlikely. A comparison with Czech Cubist architecture of those years might also be illuminating.

== Magnum Opus ==
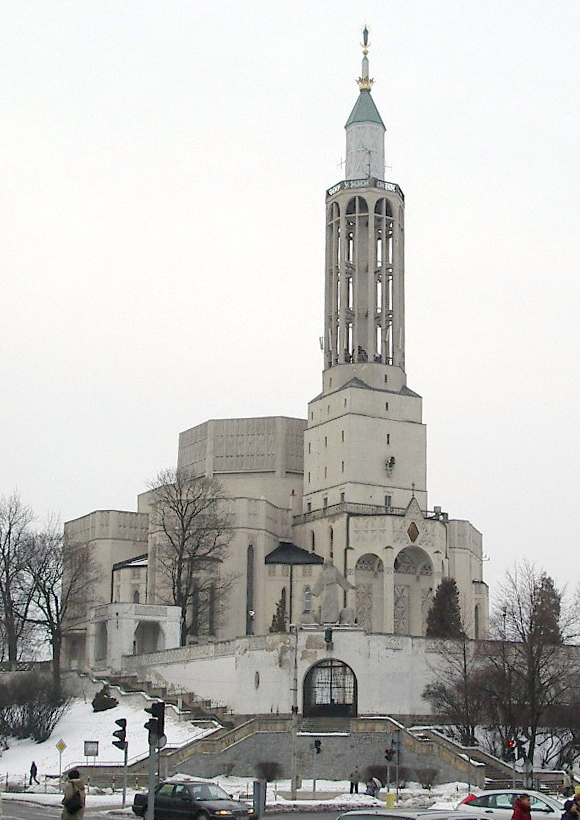
St. Roch in Białystok

All this then led to Sosnowski’s magnum opus of the late 1920s, the Białystok Church (St. Roch's Church in Białystok). It has sometimes been compared to the work of the pioneer of reinforced concrete, Auguste Perret; but Sosnowski’s spatial imagination and his judicious use of crystalline Art Déco motifs go far beyond anything one may find in the work of the French master. In a similar way one may draw again comparisons with German avant-garde design. One is reminded of the revolutionary drawings of the immediate post war years, by Wassili Luckhardt or Bruno Taut, but one would look in vain for a realisation of these dreams in Germany, in a manner that is both as daring and as controlled as Sosnowski’s church. Naturally, the medium-sized town of Białystok could not afford the vast building of the kind which appeared in the architect’s painted dreams of the same years, but Sosnowski maximised the effect of the church on a hill as a Stadtkrone – which is naturally something that can only be experienced on the spot. The quality of the interior space might be summarised by the way one can see it, almost simultaneously, as a dense forest of piers and as a continuous soaring of openings covered by the lightest kind of ceilings. From that point one may, finally, look forward to the way in which the mighty Polish Catholic Church took up the task and built, all over the country, its large number of fiercely inventive sanctuaries in the 1970s to 1990s.

== Selected works ==
- Bałabanów in Lvov (1908)
- Warsaw: Church of the Immaculate Conception of the Virgin Mary in the Parish of St. James (St.Jacob / Sw.Jakuba) 1909-1923 Plac Narutowicza
- Parish Church of St. Agnes in Goniądz (1924)
- The expressionist Church of Christ the King and St. Roch in Białystok. It is one of the first modernist churches in the world. (1927–1939)
- Białystok - Starosielce: Church. Stanislaus (1937–1938)
- Lublin: Catholic Church. St. Michael the Archangel at Bronowice(1930–1938)
- Churches in Orłów, Grodno, Grudziądz, Fałków, Chlewiska
- Book - Establishment, structure, and characteristics of the street network in the metropolitan Warsaw region (Powstanie, układ i cechy charakterystyczne sieci ulicznej na obszarze wielkiej Warszawy) (1930), * Construction achievements in Poland (Dzieje budownictwa w Polsce) unfinished work, Volume I, published by PWN in 1964.
Interior of the Church Christ the King and St. Roch. 1927

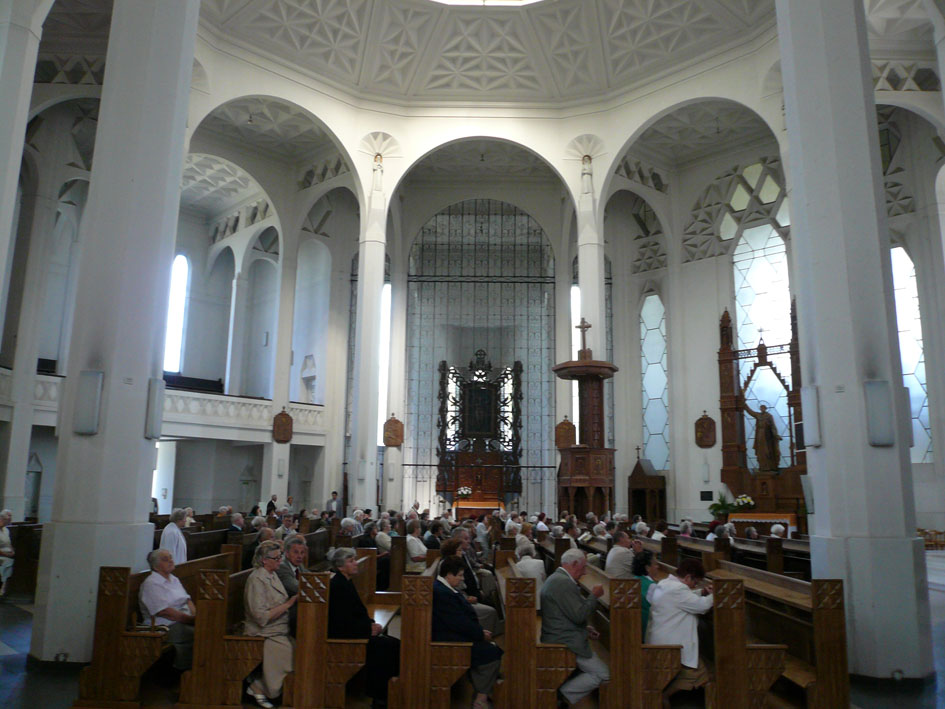
Interior looking north - Church Christ the King and St. Roch. 1927

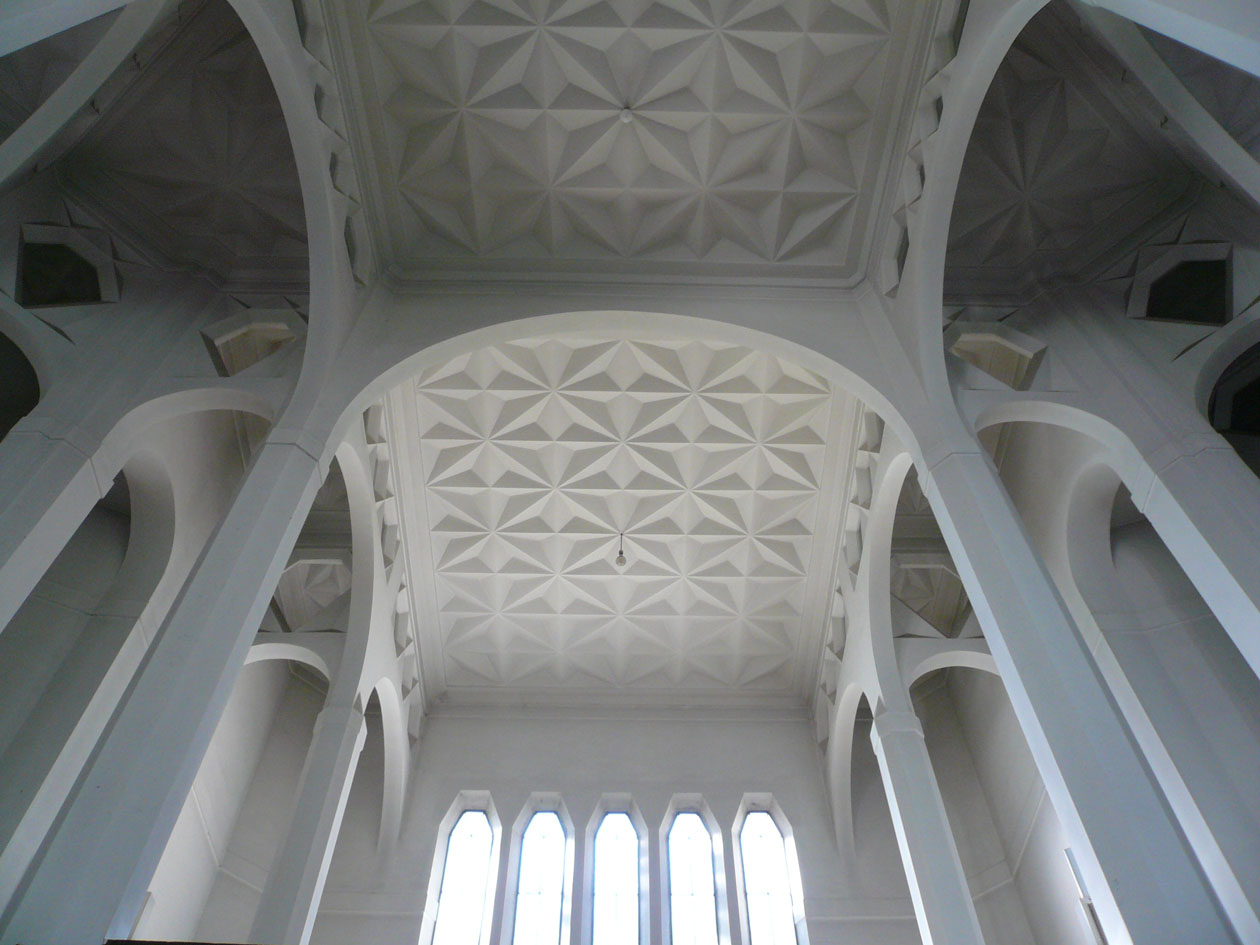
Vaulting near entrance - Church Christ the King and St. Roch. 1927

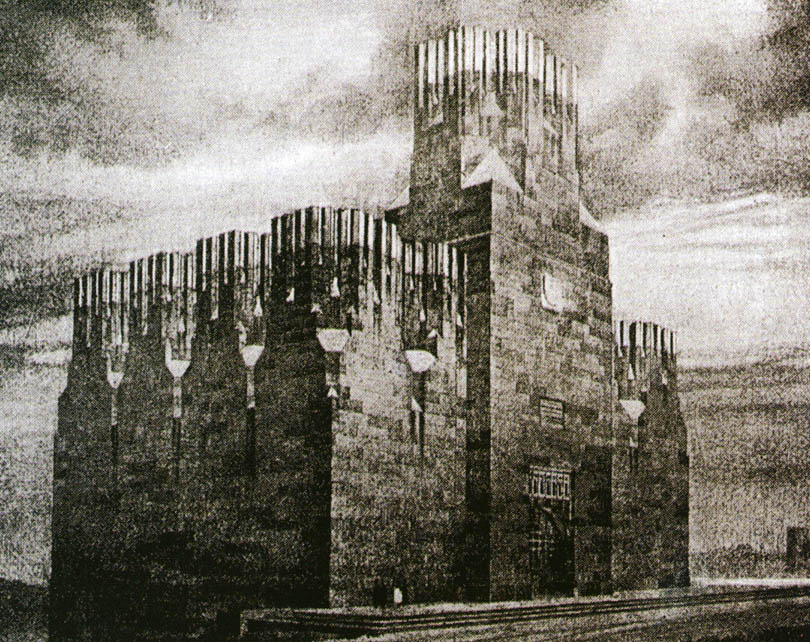
Drawing for an "Aspired Archive of an Independent Poland" 1912

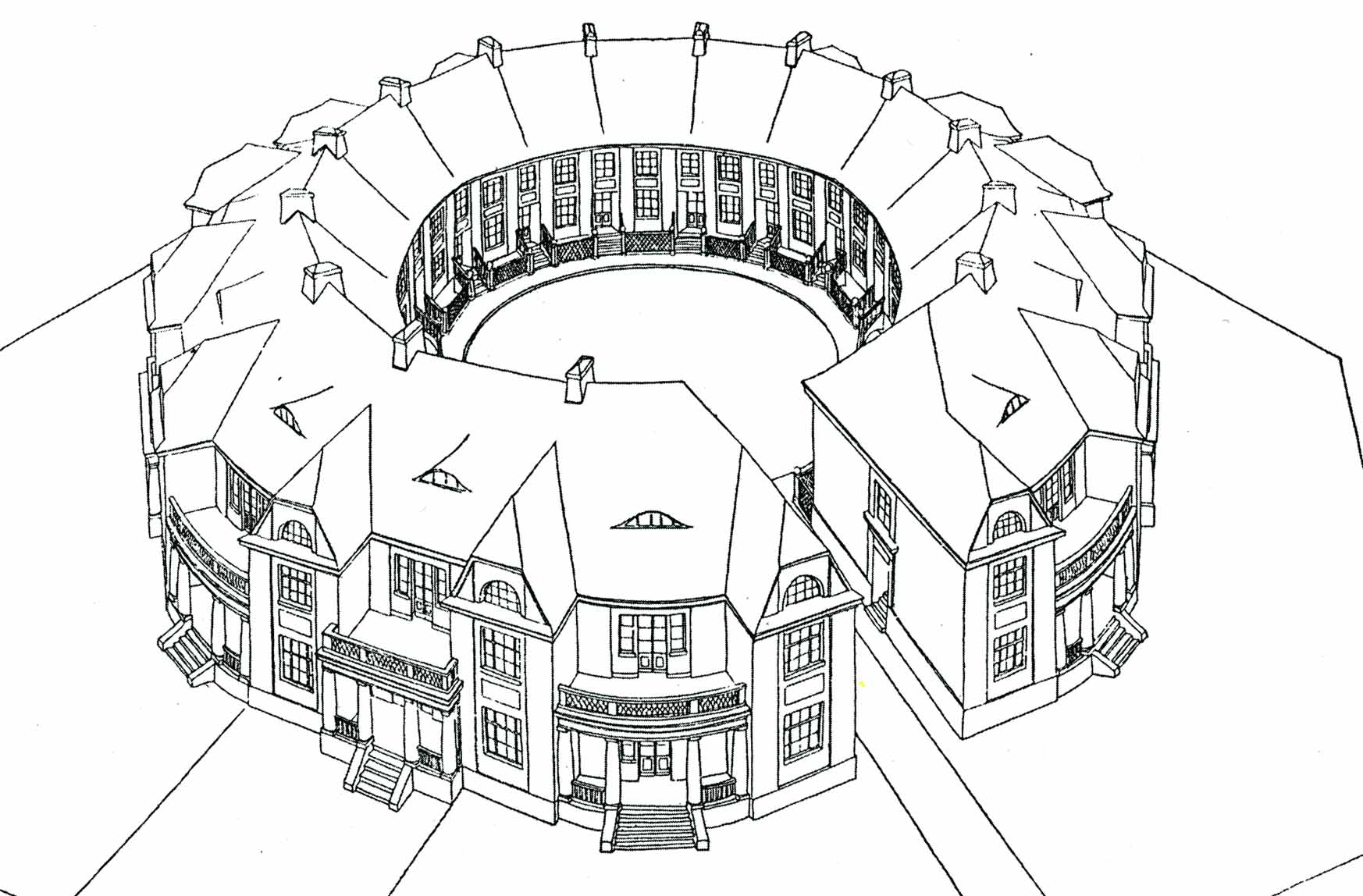
Warsaw ‘Okolnica’ / Circle, project 1924

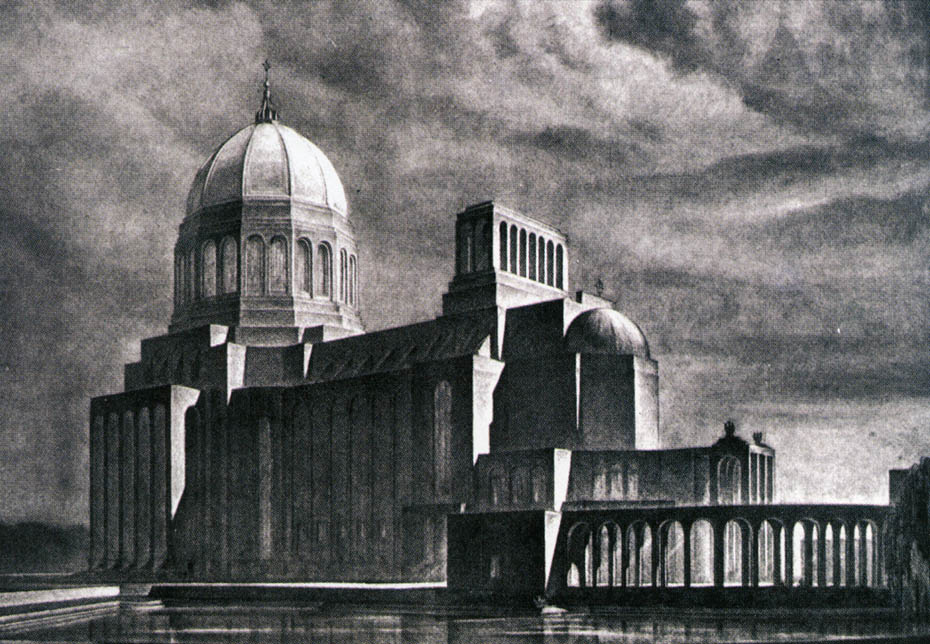
Design for the Church of the Holy Providence. 1932

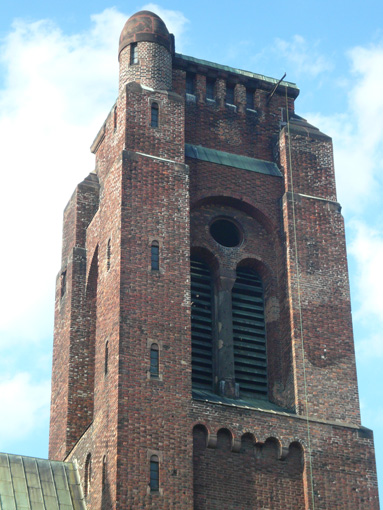
Tower of the Church of the Immaculate Conception of St. Mary. 1909

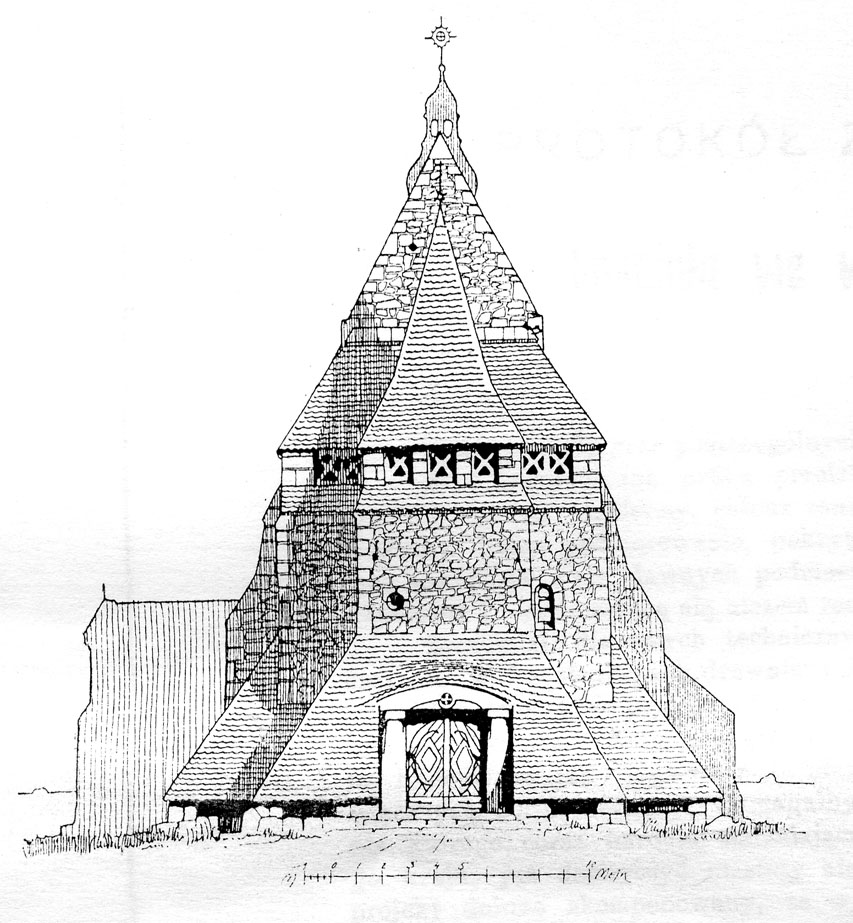
Competition entry for Orłów church, project 1910

== Commemoration ==
Since 2012 in Białystok in Przydworcowe and Centrum there is a Sosnowski Street.
