= Jašiūnai Manor =

Coordinates: 54°26′01″N 25°17′55″E

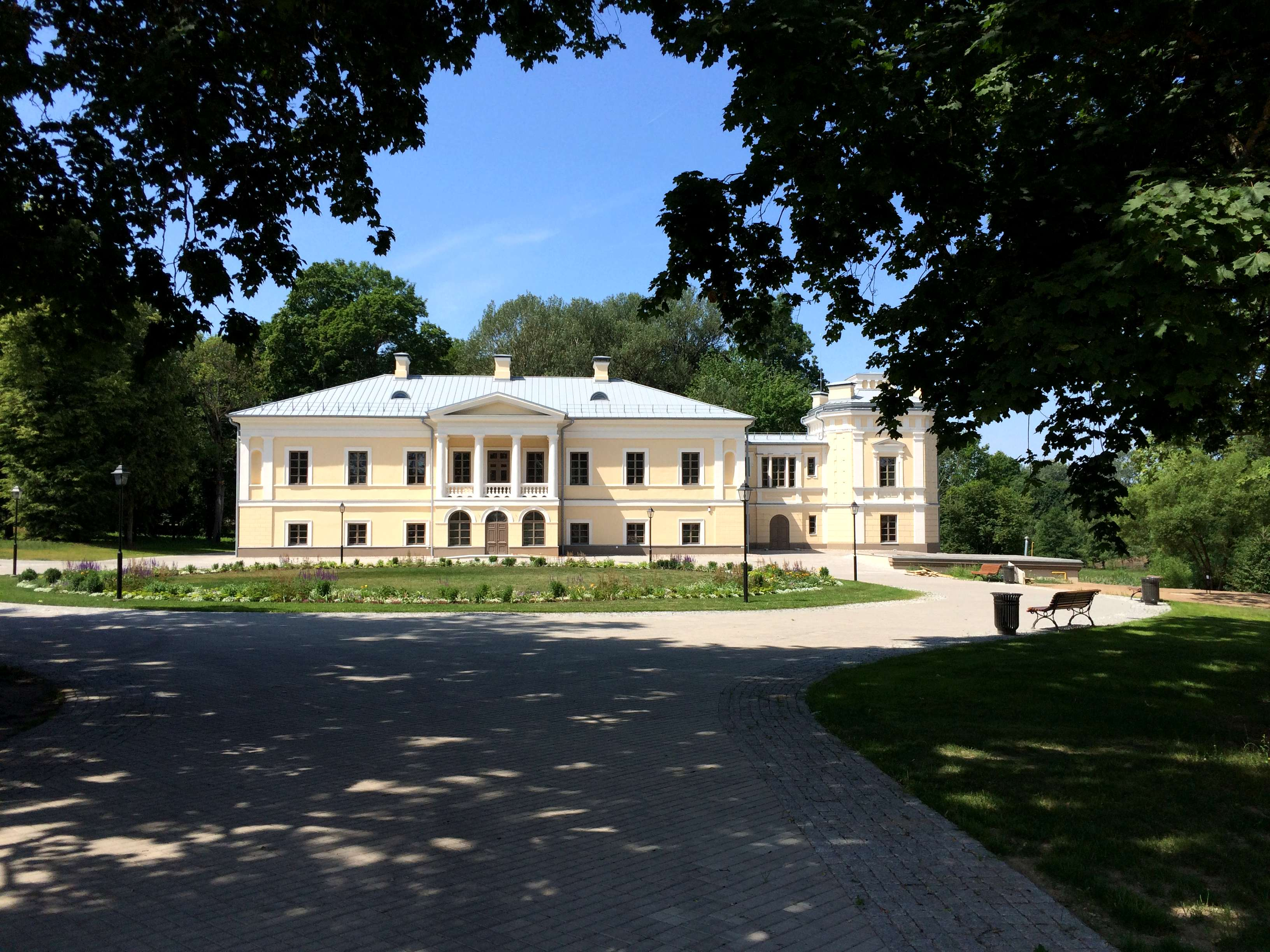
Jašiūnai manor at present

Jašiūnai Manor is the neoclassical manor in Jašiūnai, Šalčininkai district of Lithuania, near River Merkys.

The manor palace, designed by a famous architect Karol Podczaszyński, was commissioned by the historian Michał Baliński and his wife Zofia on the initiative of rector of the Imperial University of Vilna, Jan Śniadecki, who was Zofia's father. The palace was built in 1824–1828, along with supporting buildings and a manor park. A side-adjacent octagonal pavilion is connected to the palace by a short linking passage. It was built for Jan Baliński by Apolinary Mikulski.

The manor had been a cultural center in the early 19th century. For a time, it was a residence of Juliusz Słowacki, who had been frequently visited by Adam Mickiewicz and Tomasz Zan. The palace housed extensive collections, including the libraries of Śniadecki and Baliński, as well as numerous paintings by artists such as Franciszek Smuglewicz, Jan Rustem, and Jan Krzysztof Damel. All of these collections were looted in September 1939.

The building has preserved its unique late neoclassical style features with certain traits of the Empire style and Romanticism. During the Soviet period, the palace housed a collective farm. In 1978, it underwent conservation work. Between 2013 and 2015, it was comprehensively restored. The manor is included in the Lithuania's cultural heritage list.

== Bibliography ==
- Rąkowski, Grzegorz (2017). Kresowe rezydencje. Zamki, pałace i dwory na dawnych ziemiach wschodnich II RP (in Polish). Vol. 1. Warsaw.
