= Zhyrmuny =

Zhyrmuny Жырмуны (Belarusian) Жирмуны (Russian) Żyrmuny • Žirmūnai
- Agrotown
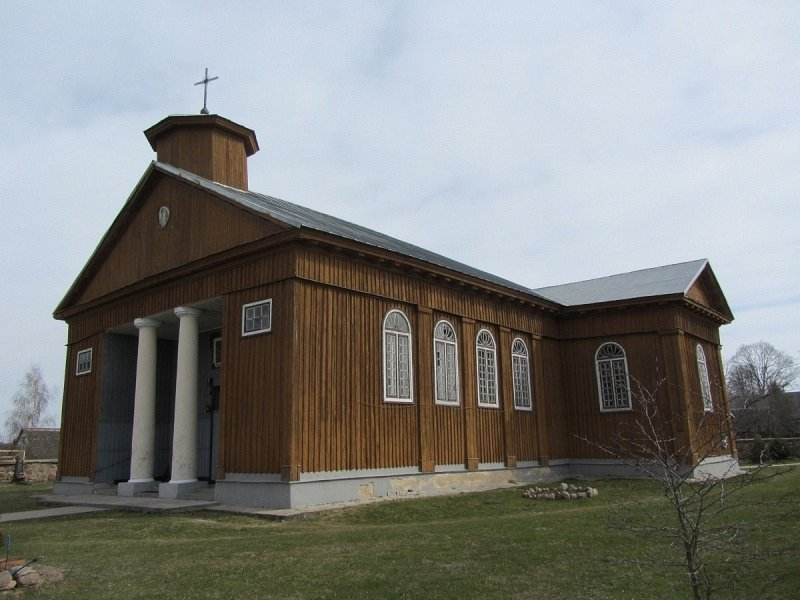
- Church of the Discovery of Holy Cross
- Interactive map of Zhyrmuny
- Location within Belarus
- Coordinates: 54°01′N 25°13′E
- Country: Belarus
- Region: Grodno Region
- District: Voranava District
- Population: 662
- Time zone: UTC+3 (MSK)
- Area code: +375 1561

Zhyrmuny (Belarusian: Жырмуны, romanized: Žyrmuny; (Note: Official transliteration.) Russian: Жирмуны, romanized: Zhirmuny; Polish: Żyrmuny; Lithuanian: Žirmūnai) is an agrotown in Voranava District, Grodno Region, Belarus. It serves as the administrative center of Zhyrmuny rural council (selsoviet). It is located 16 kilometres (9.9 mi) from the border with Lithuania.

== History ==
The place is first mentioned in the chronicles of the 15th century when it was the property of the Butrym family. In 1437, a church was established by the merchant Wojciech Kuciuk. In 1513, it became the property of Field Hetman Jerzy Radziwiłł. In the 17th century, it was transferred to the Zawisza family, and in 1624, Jan Zawisza built a new church, which burned down in the middle of the century. In the early 18th century, the village reverted to the Radziwiłłs and was granted town privileges by the King of Poland and Grand Duke of Lithuania August II. In 1788, another church was established, the St. Cross Church, which was designed by Jan Podczaszyński, father of the famous Polish-Lithuanian architect Karol Podczaszyński, who was also born in the village. This church survives to this day.

== See also ==
- Žirmūnai, a district of Vilnius
