= Nikolai Chagin =

Russian architect (1823–1909)

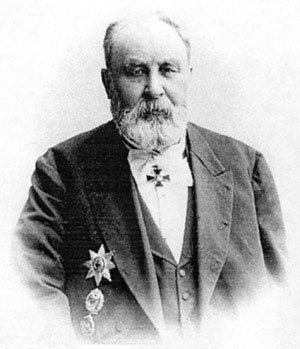
Nikolai Chagin

Nikolay Mikhailovich Chagin (Николай Михайлович Чагин; 20 November 1823 in Oryol – 1909) was a Russian architect active primarily in Vilnius and the Crimea. He took part in the Siege of Sevastopol and served as Vilno's main architect for 38 years. Chagin mastered the Byzantine Revival and several other revivalist styles, often blending them. His church buildings include:

- Nativity Cathedral, Riga
- Cathedral of the Theotokos, Vilnius
- St. Paraskeva Church, Vilnius
- St. Euphrosyne Church, Vilnius
- St. Catherine Church, Vilnius
- Bell tower of St. Anne's Church, Vilnius
- St Simeon and St Anne's Cathedral, Jelgava
- St. Mary's Church, Grodno
- Church of the Resurrection, Foros
- The interior of the Chersonesus Cathedral

== See also ==
- Neo-Byzantine architecture in the Russian Empire
