= Karol Podczaszyński =

Polish architect

- Born: 7 November 1790; Žyrmuny, Grand Duchy of Lithuania, Polish-Lithuanian Commonwealth
- Died: 19 April 1860 (aged 69); Vilnius, Russian Empire
- Resting place: Rasos Cemetery, Vilnius
- Education: Krzemieniec Lyceum; Imperial Academy of Arts
- Alma mater: Vilnius University
- Occupations: Architect; professor

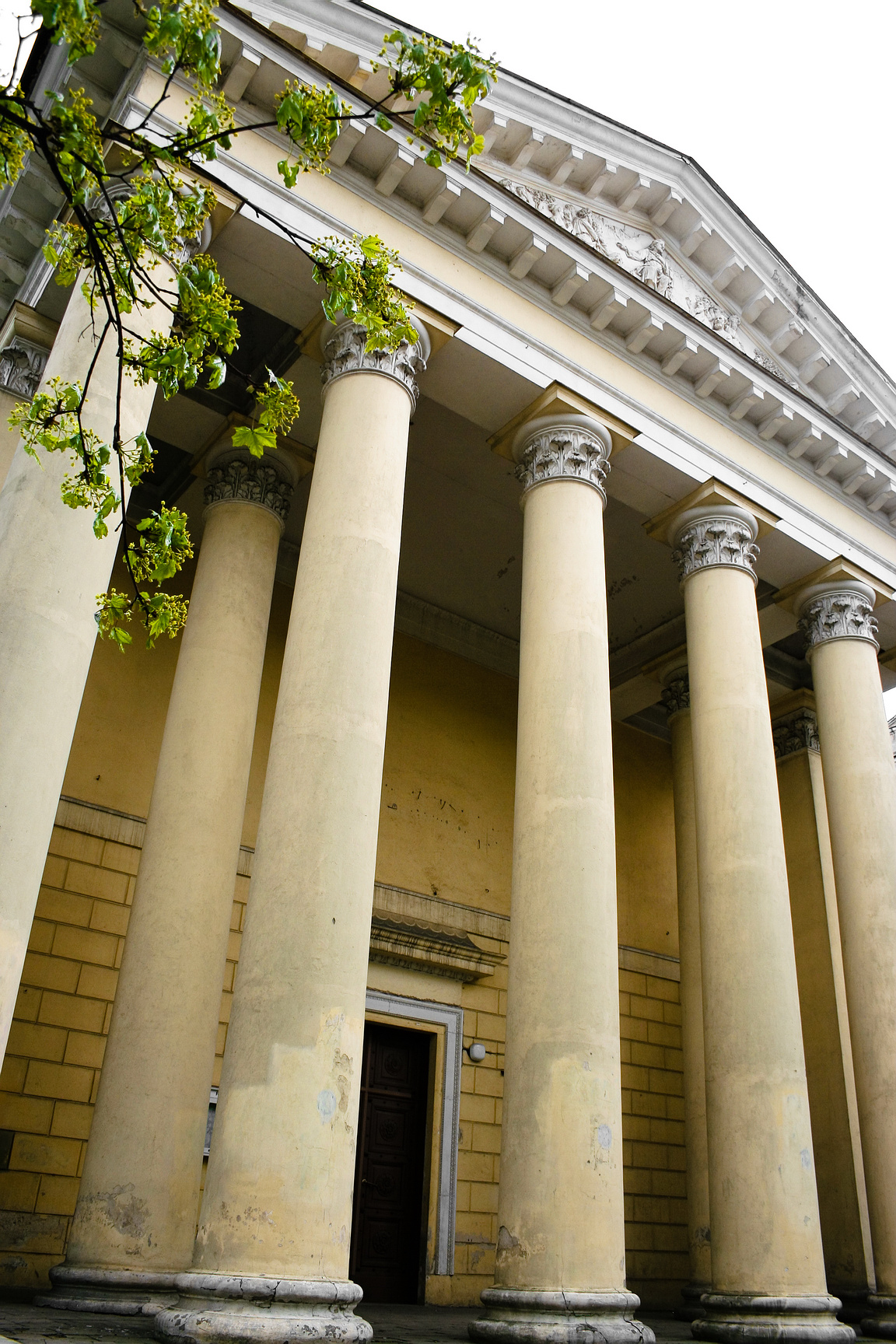
Evangelical Reformers Church in Vilnius, the finest work of Podczaszyński

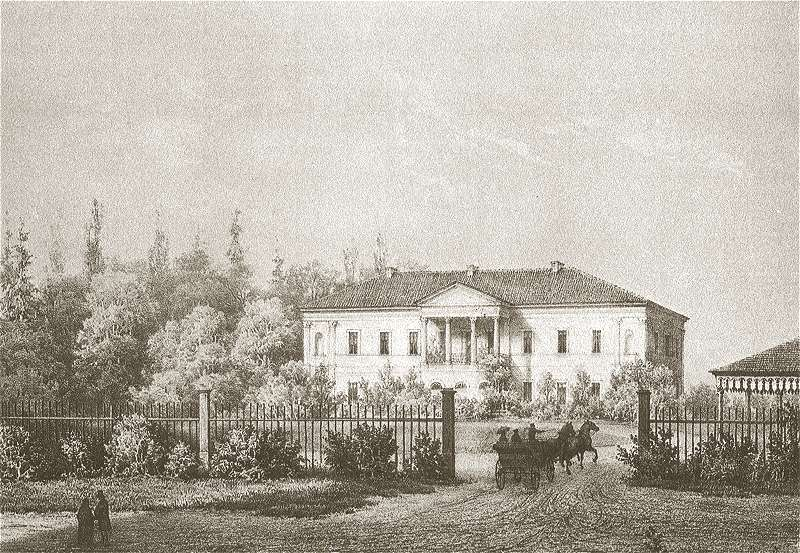
Drawing of the Jašiūnai Manor in the 19th century

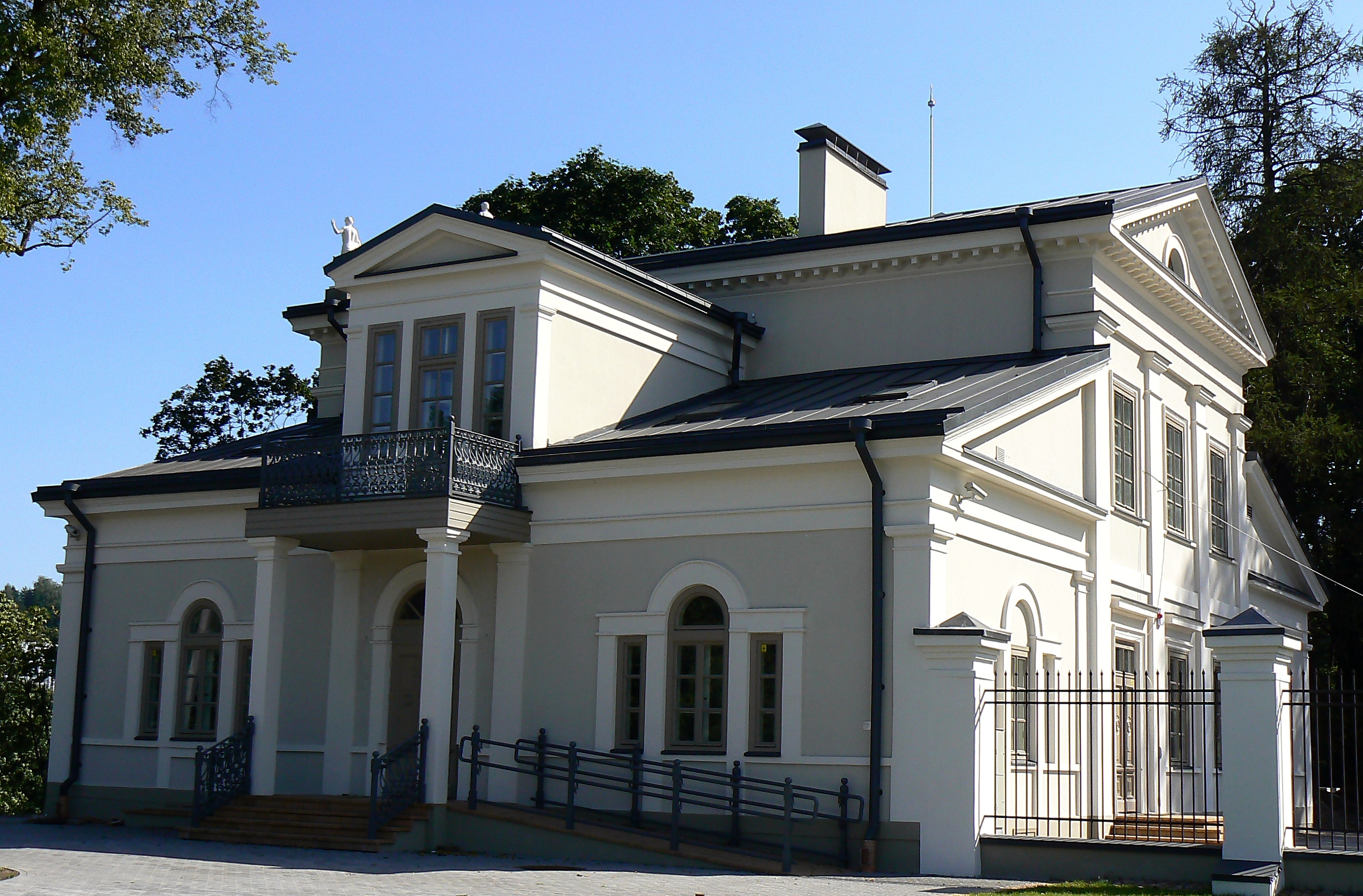
Tuskulėnai manor palace

Karol Podczaszyński (Lithuanian: Karolis Podčašinskis; 7 November 1790 – 19 April 1860) was a Polish-Lithuanian leading Vilnius architect, a representative of the neoclassical architecture and a professor of the Vilnius University, as well as one of the pioneers of industrial design.

He was born on 7 November 1790 in the village of Žyrmuny near Lida, in what is now the Grodno Region of Belarus. He graduated from the prestigious Polish Krzemieniec Lyceum and the Vilnius University. Between 1814 and 1816 he continued his studies on architecture in St. Petersburg, where he became the first Pole on the Imperial Academy of Arts. Between 1817 and 1819 Podczaszyński also travelled around European countries, visiting Königsberg, Danzig, Berlin, Paris, Naples, Venice and Vienna before returning to Cracow. Upon his return to Vilnius in 1819, he was offered a chair of architecture, which he accepted.

Among his most notable architectural works are the refurbishment of the interior of the Vilna University (1802-1804), including the Aula's interior, Evangelical Reformers' Church (1829-1835) and the neoclassical Jan Śniadecki's manor in Jašiūnai (reconstructed between 1824 and 1828). Yet another of Podczaszyński's major works was the neo-Palladian Tusculanum manor (in modern Žirmūnai, Vilnius), completed in 1825. The entire Žirmūnai microdistrict in Vilnius was named after his native village, a part of the Grand Duchy of Lithuania at the time of his birth.

As a noted architect, Podczaszyński also supervised a number of other projects, among them the reconstruction of the Palace of Governors in Vilnius, carried out by Vasily Stasov. In modern times the palace serves as the seat of the President of Lithuania. Podczaszyński has also reconstructed the Orthodox Cathedral of the Theotokos into the Anatomicum of his alma mater (1822). Finally, between 1836 and 1838 he designed the interior of three chapels of the St. Władysław and Stanisław Cathedral of Vilnius and reconstructed the Town Hall in Kaunas.

In 1839, Podczaszyński took the first known daguerreotype in present-day Lithuania.

As a theoretician, he authored works on architecture and industrial design. Podczaszyński died in Vilnius on 19 April 1860 at age 70 and was interred in Rasos Cemetery.

His son, Paweł Bolesław Podczaszyński also became a noted architect.

== Publications ==
Among the best-known Podczaszyński's publications are monographs on industrial design:

- On the beauty of works of industry (Polish: O piękności w robotach przemysłu; 1821)
- Application of general principles of excellence of industrial designs in paintings, sculptures and garden design (Polish: Zastosowanie ogólnych zasad doskonałosci w tworach przemysłu do obrazów i posągów, tudzież do urządzenia ogrodów rozkosznych, czyli ogrojców; 1838)

He also prepared dictionary of Polish carpentry terms (Polish: Nomenklatura architektoniczna, czyli słowomiennik cieśliczych polskich wyrazów 1843). Podczaszyński was also the author of two handbooks of architecture for universities: one for professors (1822) and one for the students (published in three volumes between 1828 and 1856).
