= History of Vilnius =

History of the capital city of Lithuania

- "Legend has it that the Grand Duke of Lithuania, Gediminas, was hunting in the sacred forest near the Valley of Šventaragis. Tired after the successful day's hunt, the Grand Duke settled in nearby for the night. He fell soundly asleep and began to dream. A huge Iron Wolf was standing on top of a hill and the sound of hundreds of other wolves inside it filled all of the surrounding fields and woods. Upon awakening, the Duke asked the pagan priest Lizdeika to interpret the meaning of the dream." And the priest told him: "What is destined for the ruler and the State of Lithuania, is thus: the Iron Wolf represents a castle and a city which will be established by you on this site. This city will be the capital of the Lithuanian lands and the dwelling of their rulers, and the glory of their deeds shall echo throughout the world"
- The Legend of the Founding of Vilnius

The city of Vilnius, the capital and largest city of Lithuania, has an extensive history starting from the Stone Age. The city has changed hands many times between Imperial and Soviet Russia, Napoleonic France, Imperial and Nazi Germany, Interwar Poland, and Lithuania.

Initially a Baltic settlement, Vilnius became a significant city under the Grand Duchy of Lithuania. The city was first mentioned in written sources in 1323 in letters by Grand Duke Gediminas, who invited Jews and Germans to settle and built a wooden castle on a hill. Vilnius gained city rights in 1387 after the Christianization of Lithuania and grew as craftsmen and merchants from various nationalities settled in the city. Vilnius was the head of the Grand Duchy until 1795, and during the Polish–Lithuanian Commonwealth. Under the Commonwealth, Vilnius flourished, especially after the establishment of Vilnius University by King Stephen Báthory in 1579. The city became a major cultural and scientific center, attracting migrants from both the East and West. It was marked by diverse communities, including Jewish, Orthodox, and German populations. The city experienced significant growth and development, though it faced numerous invasions and occupations, including by the Teutonic Knights, Russia, and later, Germany.

During the Russian Empire's rule, Vilnius became the capital of Vilna Governorate and saw various cultural revivals. The 19th and early 20th centuries were marked by national revivals among Jews, Poles, Lithuanians, and Belarusians. After World War I, Vilnius was often the site of conflict, between Poland and Lithuania, leading to its temporary occupation by Poland, before being annexed by the Soviet Union during World War II.

Following the war, Vilnius became the capital of the Lithuanian Soviet Socialist Republic, and later, after the fall of the Soviet Union, it became the capital of an independent Lithuania. The city has since evolved rapidly, transforming from a Soviet-dominated enclave into a modern European city. Significant events, such as the NATO summit in July 2023, highlight Vilnius's ongoing importance on the international stage.

== Grand Duchy of Lithuania ==
=== Origins until 1400 ===
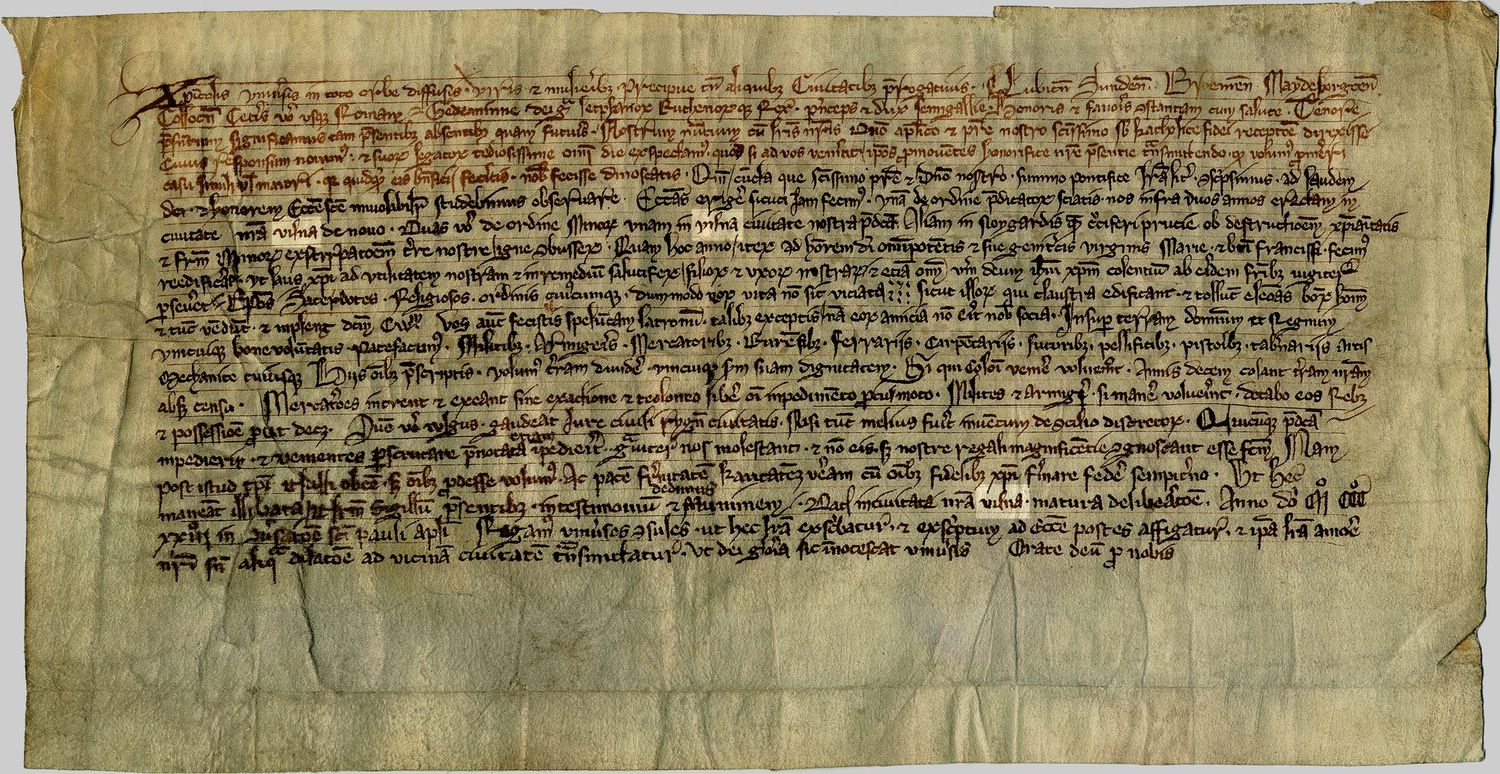
The oldest known mentioning of Vilnius in written sources in a Gediminas' letter, 25 January 1323

The earliest settlements in the area of present-day Vilnius appear to be of Mesolithic origin. Numerous archaeological findings in different parts of the city prove that the area has been inhabited by peoples of various cultures since the early Middle Ages. Initially a Baltic settlement, later it was also inhabited by Slavs, Jews and Germans. Some historians identify the city with Voruta, a forgotten capital of King Mindaugas.

The city was first mentioned in written sources as Vilna in 1323 as the capital city of the Grand Duchy of Lithuania in the letters of Gediminas. Gediminas built his wooden castle on a hill in the city. The city became more widely known after he wrote a circular letter of invitation to Germans and Jews to the principal Hansa towns in 1325, offering free access into his domains to men of every order and profession. Gediminas founded first Dominican monastery in 1321. In the second half of the century church of St. Nicholas was erected. At this time Vilnius was facing numerous raids of the Teutonic Order, although they never captured the castle, large portions of the town were burned down in years 1365, 1377 and 1383.

According to a tale, tired after a busy hunting day, Gediminas had a prophetic dream about an iron wolf howling on a top of the hill. When he asked a krivis (a pagan priest) Lizdeika for an explanation of the dream, he was told that he must build a castle on the top of that hill, which is strategically surrounded by three rivers (Neris, Vilnia, and Vingria (now underground)) and a grand city around that hill, so that "the iron-wolf-like sound about this great city would spread around the world".

Vilnius was granted city rights by Jogaila in 1387, following the Christianization of Lithuania and the construction of the Vilnius Cathedral. The town was initially populated by local Lithuanians, but soon the population began to grow as craftsmen and merchants of other nationalities settled in the city. In the 14th century, the town was marked by wooden architecture. Stone building existed only at the foot of mount Gediminas and in the surroundings of the Vokiečių gatvė (German street), where German craftsmen and merchants were housed around the Church of Saint Nicholas.

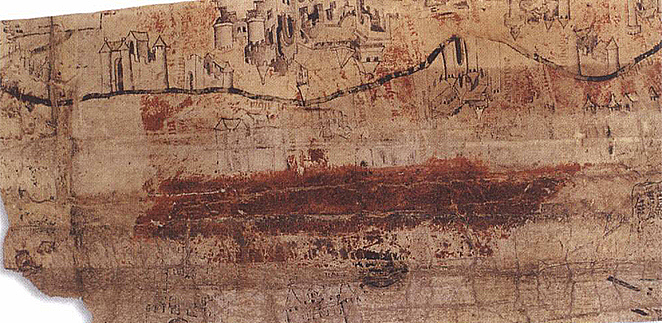
The earliest known depiction of Vilnius, late 14th century

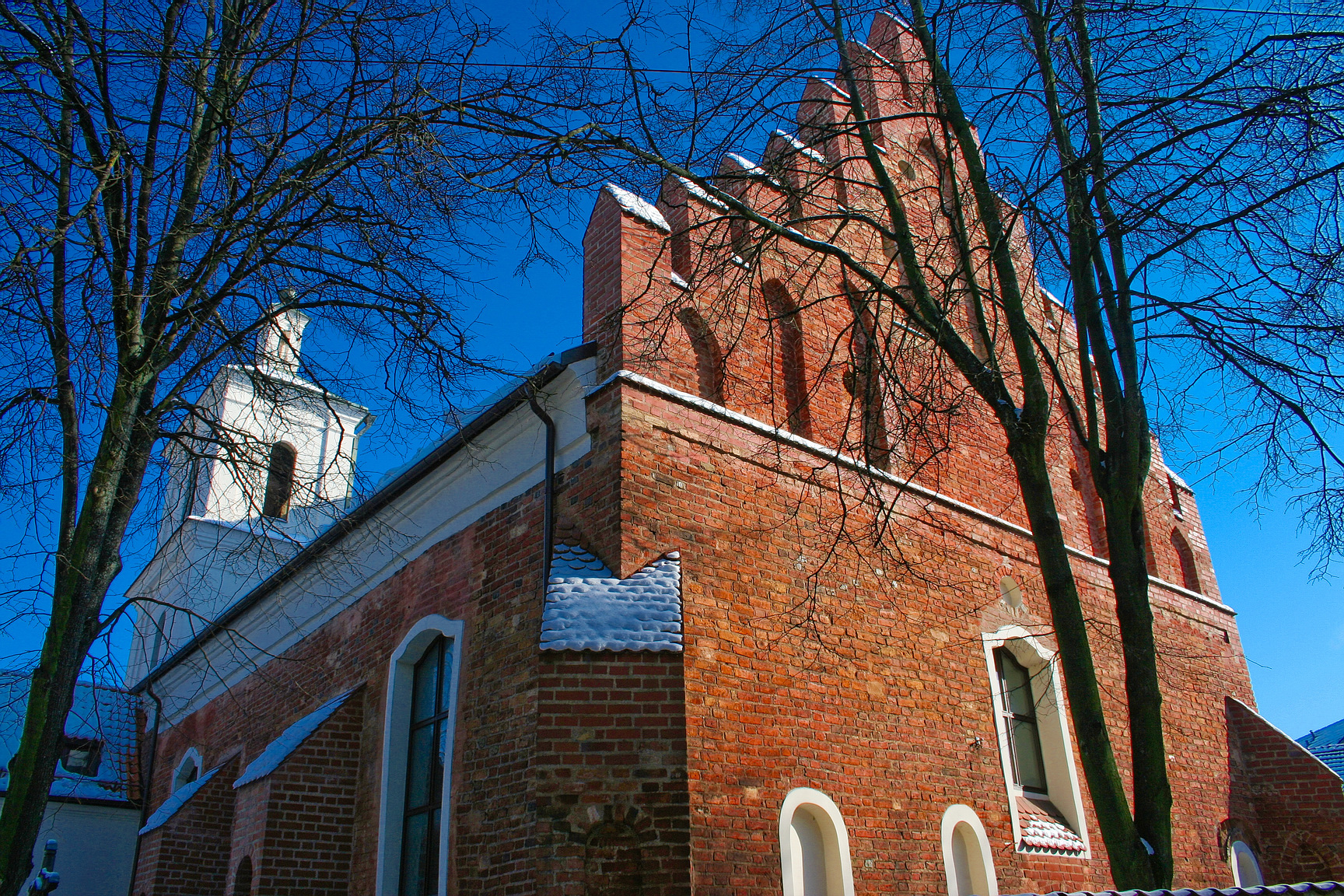
St. Nicholas, the oldest church in Lithuania built before 1387

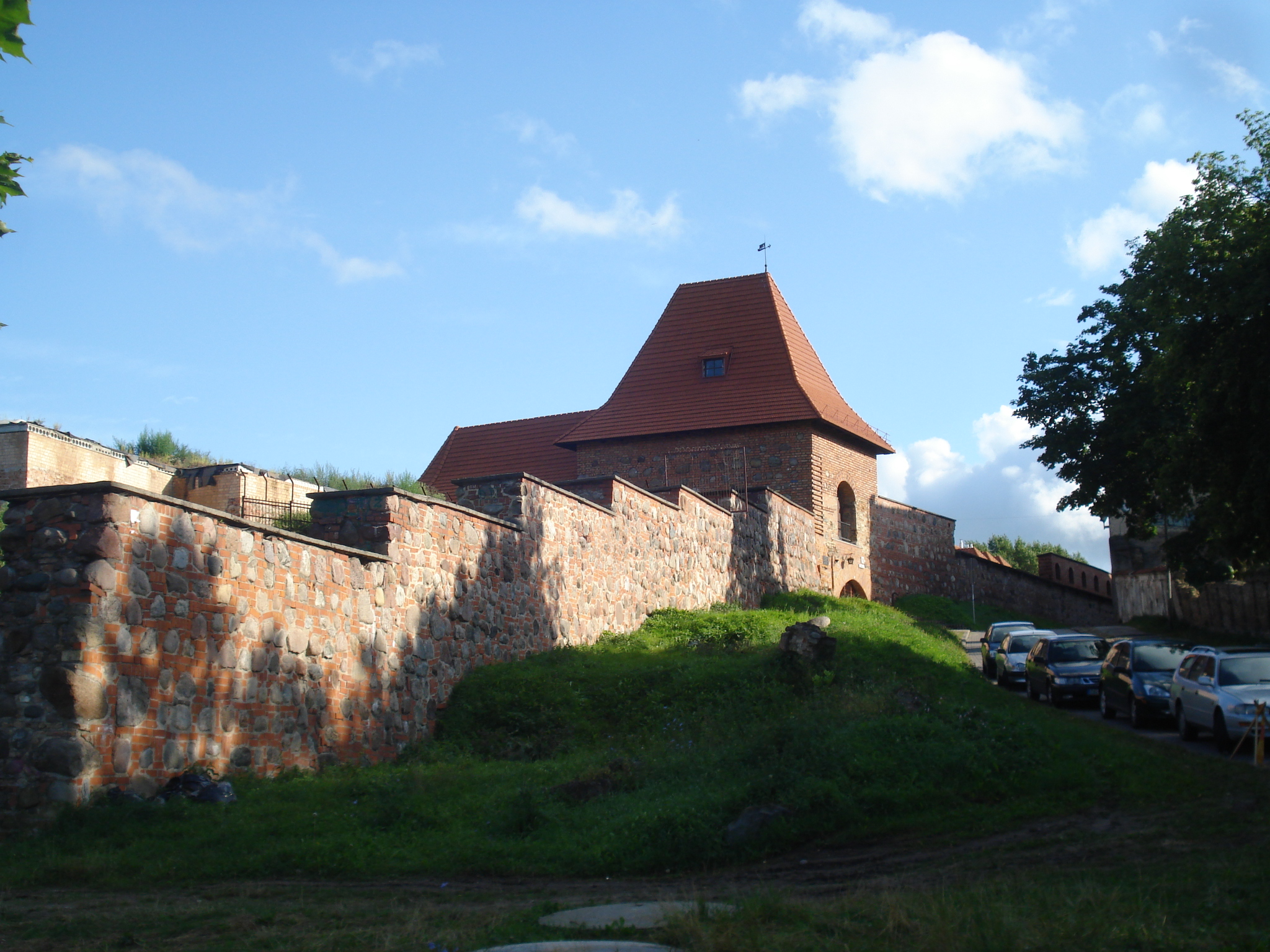
Remaining Wall of Vilnius fragment

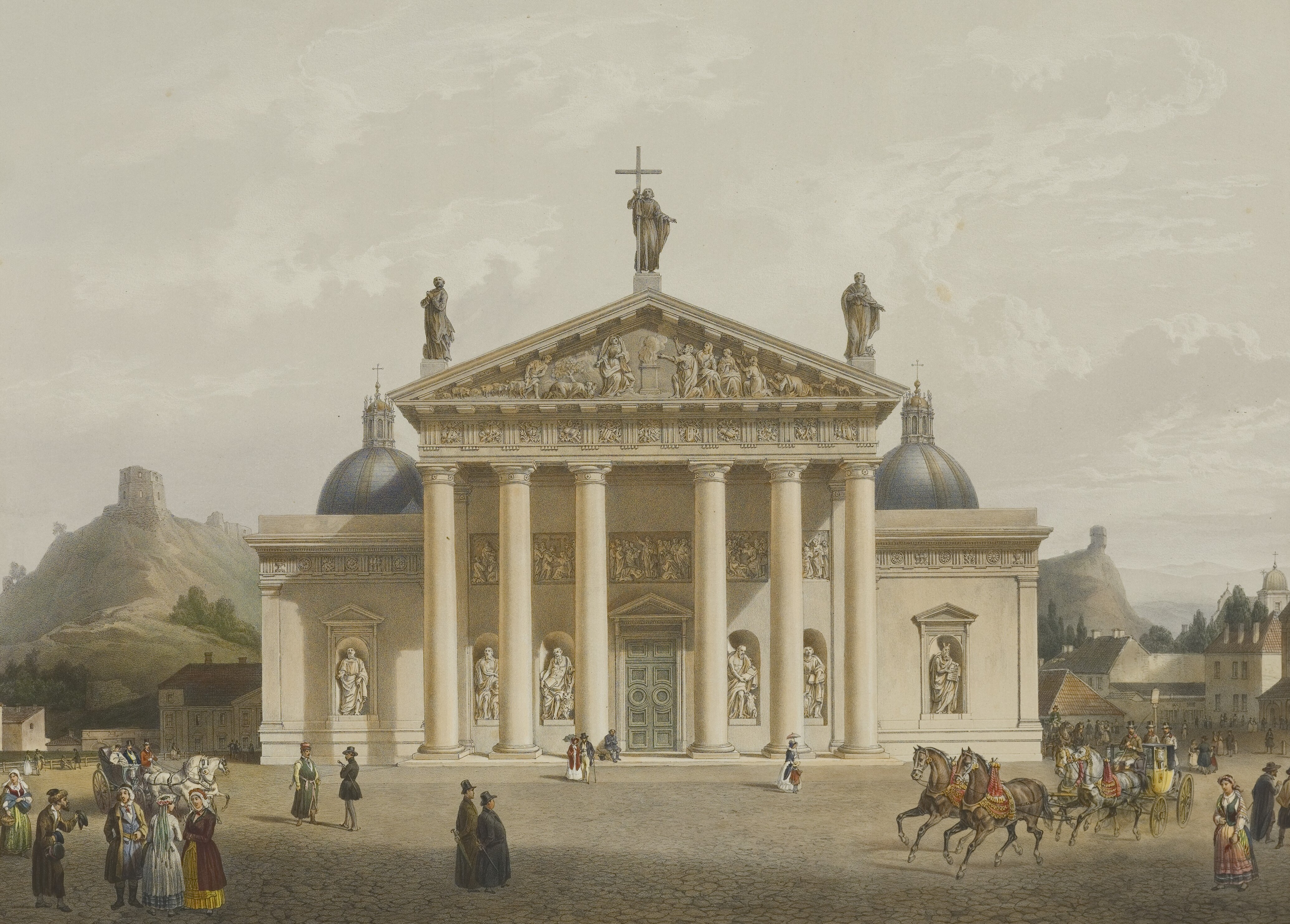
Vilnius Cathedral in 1847

In the 14th century, Lithuania was frequently invaded by the Teutonic Order. The future King of England Henry IV (then Henry Bolingbroke) spent a full year in 1390 supporting the unsuccessful siege of Vilnius by Teutonic Knights with his 300 knights. During this campaign, he bought captured Lithuanian women and children, and took them back to Königsberg for conversion to Christianity. King Henry's second expedition to Lithuania in 1392 illustrates the financial benefits of these guest crusaders to the Order. His small army consisted of over 100 men, including longbow archers and six minstrels, at a total cost to the Lancastrian purse of £4,360. Despite the efforts of Bolingbroke and his English crusaders, two years of attacks on Vilnius proved fruitless.

During the inaugurations of Lithuanian monarchs, Gediminas' Cap was placed on the monarch's head by the Bishop of Vilnius in Vilnius Cathedral.

=== 15th century ===
In 1409, Gediminas' Tower was built in Vilnius. In 1413, the city became the capital of the newly formed Vilnius Voivodeship by the Union of Horodło. In 1426, the Church of St. John was built. In 1469, the Church of Saints Bernard and Francis founded. At the end of the 15th century, St. Anne's Church was built, and consecrated in 1500.

The gradual Polonization of Vilnius, which began in the late 14th century, proceeded through the influx of Polish elements and assimilation of non-Polish burghers. The early Polish population was composed mainly of clerics, craftsmen and merchants, who migrated to the Lithuanian capital in particularly noticeable numbers after the Polish court of Sigismund August moved to Vilnius.

=== Early 16th century until 1569 ===
Between 1503 and 1522, for the sake of protection from Crimean Tatar attacks, the city was surrounded by defensive walls that had nine gates and three towers. Communities of Lithuanians, Jews, Ruthenians, and Germans were present in different areas of Vilnius. The Orthodox inhabitants concentrated in the eastern part of the city left of the "Castle Street", while most Germans and Jews occupied the western side of the city around the "German Street". The town reached the peak of its development under the reign of Sigismund II Augustus, Grand Duke of Lithuania and King of Poland, who relocated there in 1544. In 1547, Sigismund II Augustus moved his royal court from Kraków to Vilnius, which had a great influence on the intellectual life of the region. In 1548, Sigismund II finished the Renaissance style reconstruction of the Palace of the Grand Dukes of Lithuania, which was started by his father Sigismund I. In the 16th century, Vilnius became a constantly growing and developing city, as Grand Duke of Lithuania and King of Poland Sigismund II Augustus and his mother queen Bona Sforza were spending much of their time in the Royal Palace of Lithuania.

"I saw as many jewels as I did not expect to find accumulated in one place; with them the treasures of Venice and the Pope, which I have also seen, cannot be compared."

— Papal nuncio Berardo Bongiovanni recalling about Sigismund II Augustus's treasury kept in the Palace of the Grand Dukes of Lithuania in Vilnius in 1560.

=== Polish-Lithuanian Commonwealth ===
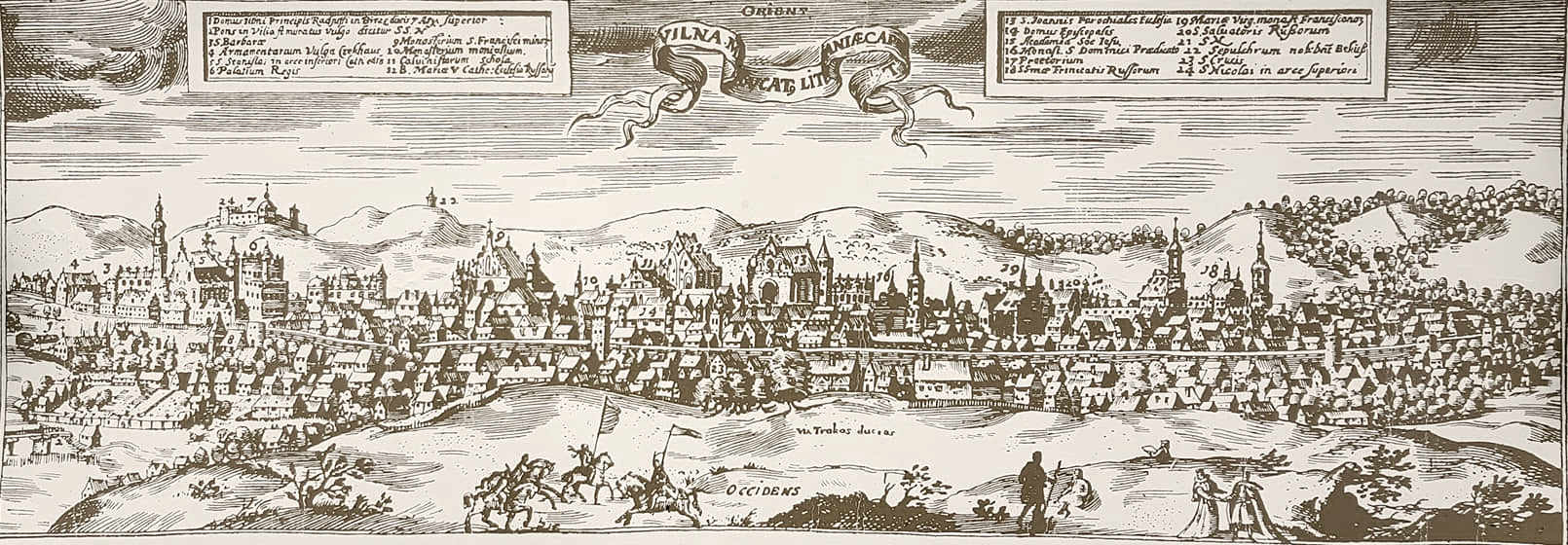
Vilnius panorama in 1600

After the Union of Lublin (1569) that created the Polish–Lithuanian Commonwealth, the city flourished further in part due to the establishment of Vilnius University by Stephen Báthory, King of Poland and Grand Duke of Lithuania in 1579. The university soon developed into one of the most important scientific and cultural centres of the region and the most notable scientific centre of the Grand Duchy of Lithuania. Political, economic and social life was in full swing there. This is among all proven by the Lithuanian Statutes issued in the 16th century, the last of which was still in force until the 19th century.

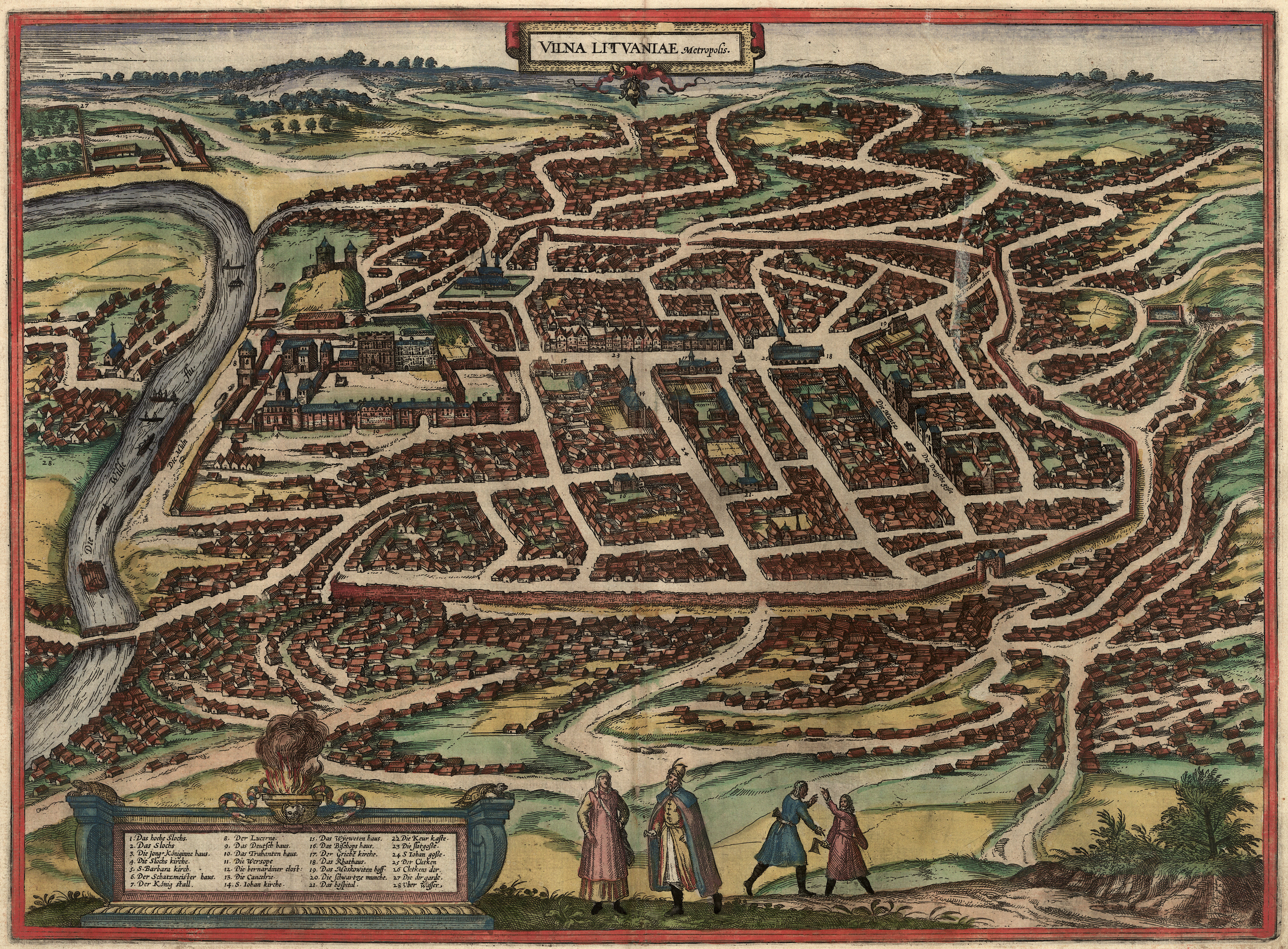
Map of Vilnius in 1576, from the "World's Cities' Atlas" by Georg Braun

Rapidly developing, the city was open to migrants from both East and West. In addition to old citizens, larger Jewish, Orthodox and German communities established themselves in the city. Each group made its contribution to the life of the city, and crafts, trade and science prospered. In the 17th century, Polish and Polonized population began to dominate culturally and likely numerically.

In 1610, the city was racked by a large fire. In 1655, during the First Northern War, Vilnius was captured by the forces of Tsardom of Russia and was pillaged, burned and the population was massacred. The death toll of around 20,000 included a large proportion of Vilnius Jews. The city's growth lost its momentum for many years, yet the number of inhabitants recovered. During the Commonwealth's decline, Vilnius became known as "Jerusalem of the North" - a major religion-cultural centre of Eastern European Jewry. In 1769, the Rasos Cemetery was founded; today it is one of the oldest surviving cemeteries in the city.

== Russian Empire ==
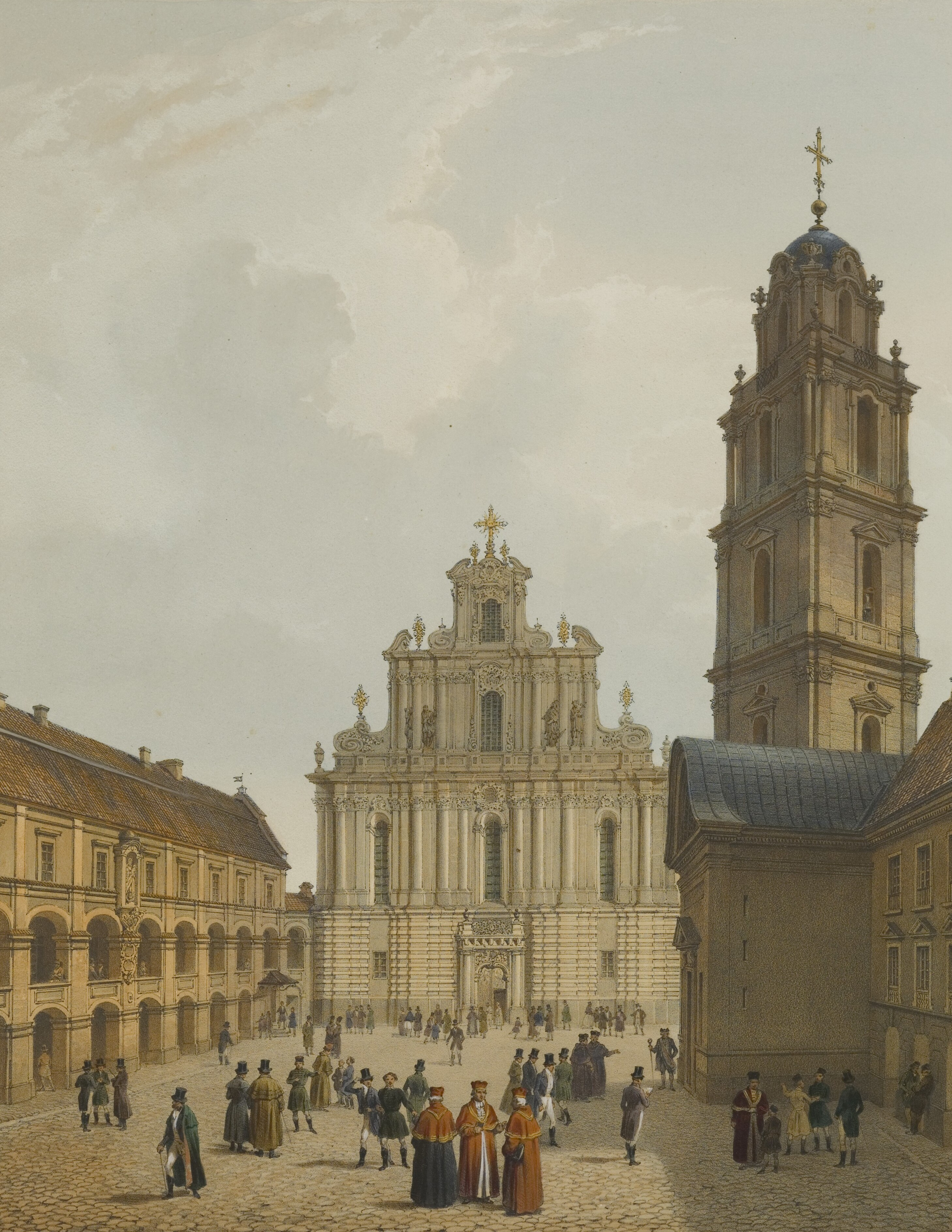
St. John's church, Jan Kazimierz Wilczyński, after 1845

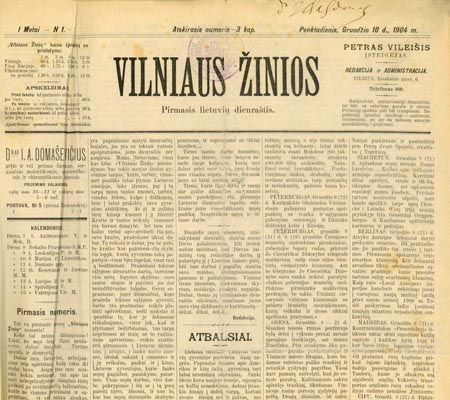
First legal newspaper Vilniaus Žinios, circulating in Vilnius after the ban on Lithuanian press printed in the Latin script was lifted

After the Third Partition of Poland in 1795, Vilnius was annexed by the Russian Empire and became the capital of Vilna Governorate, a part of the Northwestern Krai. In order to allow the city to expand, between the 1799 and 1805 period, the city walls were pulled down, only the Gate of Dawn (also known as Aušros vartai, Medininkų vartai or Ostra Brama, Вострая Брама) remained. In 1803 Alexander I re-established the Polish-language University. In 1812, the city was seized by Napoleon on his push towards Moscow. After the campaign's failure, the Grande Armée retreated to the area where 80,000 French soldiers died and were buried in the trenches they had built months earlier.

On 1 May 1832, following the fall of the November Uprising, the university was closed. In its place, two institutions were established: one for medical and surgical studies, and another for theological studies. The former was closed on 30 December 1841, while the latter was transferred to St. Petersburg in August 1842. On 29 April 1855, by decree of the Emperor, the Museum of Antiquities and the Archaeological Commission were established in Vilnius at the initiative and under the direction of Count Eustachy Tyszkiewicz. They were housed in the former university buildings.

On 15 May 1858, construction began near Vilnius on the Saint Petersburg–Warsaw railway, as well as a line to Kaunas toward the Prussian border. The first train arrived in Vilnius on 4 September 1860. The lines to St. Petersburg and Kaunas were opened on 15 March 1862, and the line to Warsaw on 6 September of the same year.

Civil unrest in 1861 was suppressed by the Imperial Russian Army. During the January Uprising in 1863 heavy city fights occurred, but were brutally pacified by Mikhail Muravyov, nicknamed The Hanger by the population because of the number of executions he organized. After the uprising, Polish was banned from public use. The Latin alphabet was prohibited in 1859 (Belarusian) and 1865 (Lithuanian); the ban was lifted in 1904.

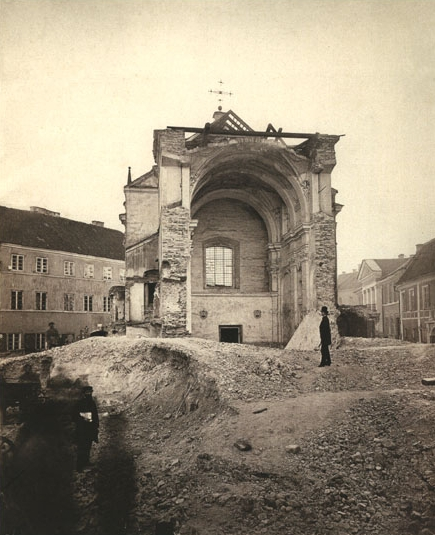
A Roman Catholic St. Joseph Church being demolished by the order of tsarist authorities, as photographed by Józef Czechowicz, Vilnius, 1877

During the second half of the 19th and the beginning of the 20th century Vilnius also became one of the centres of Jewish, Polish, Lithuanian and Belarusian national rebirths. According to the 1897 Russian census, by mother tongue, 40% of the population was Jewish, 31% Polish, 20% Russian, 4.2% Belarusian and 2.1% Lithuanian. Jewish culture and population was so dominant that some Jewish national revival leaders argued for a new Jewish state to be founded in the Vilnius region, with the city as its capital. These national revivals happened in Vilnius because it was one of the most tolerant, progressive and liberal places in the region, a legacy of tolerance deriving from the years of the Grand Duchy of Lithuania. One of the most important Polish, Belarusian poets and writers published their works in Vilnius at that time. It was the place where the first Belarusian weekly Nasha Niva was founded.

Vilnius became an important place of the act of the Lithuanian national revival on 4–5 December 1905, when the Great Seimas of Vilnius was held in the Palace of the present-day National Philharmonics, with over 2000 delegates from all regions of Lithuania as well as emigres. It was decided to make a demand to establish an autonomous ethnic Lithuanian state within the Russian Empire with its parliament (Seimas) in Vilnius.

Cultural life was revived after the 1905 Russian Revolution. Society of Friends of Science in Wilno was created in 1906 to practice science and literature in Polish. The Emilia and Eustachy Wróblewski Library, the centre of Polish culture, was established in 1912, around that time also Polish theatre was revived. Polish cultural life was still repressed despite its revival. In 1907 bishop Eduard von der Ropp was expelled from Vilnius to Vitebsk.

== Interwar period ==
=== Polish-Lithuanian conflict ===
Selected lines of demarcation between Lithuania and Poland, 1919–1991

During World War I, Vilnius was occupied by Germany from 1915 until 1918. Still under German occupation, the Council of Lithuania proclaimed the Act of Independence of Lithuania in Vilnius on 16 February 1918. The act proclaimed the restoration of the independent state of Lithuania with Vilnius as its capital. The German civilian administration of the Ober-Ost declined to pass full authority to Lithuania, which was not controlled by the Germans anymore. Instead, the Germans tried to control the area through promoting conflicts between local nationalities as it became clear that the German plan for the creation of Mitteleuropa, a net of satellite buffer states, failed.

Finally, on 1 January 1919, the German garrison withdrew and passed the authority over the city to a local Polish committee, against the pleas of the Lithuanian administration. A Polish administration started to be formed. Former members of the local Polish Self-Defence formations, now formally part of the Polish Army, took over the posts while the Lithuanians withdrew along with the Germans. On 5 January 1919 the city was taken by Bolshevik forces advancing from the east. Vilnius was proclaimed the capital of the Lithuanian–Byelorussian Soviet Socialist Republic. For the next 4 months the city became a communist experiment in governance. During the course of that conflict, on 19 April 1919 the city was again seized by Poland (Vilna offensive), this time by forces of the regular Polish Army. A year later, on 14 July 1920, it was lost to Soviet forces again (this time, the Soviets were aided by Lithuanians, who were promised Vilnius).

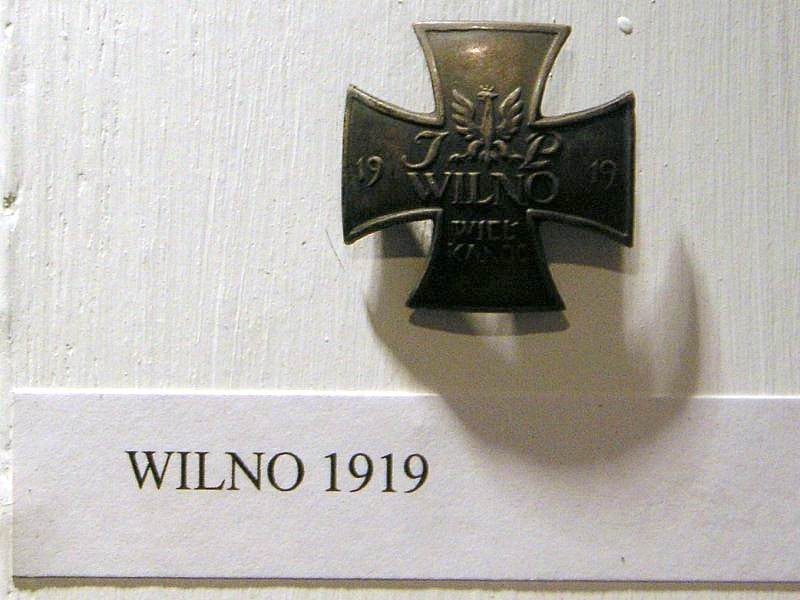
Commemorative medal for the fights in April 1919

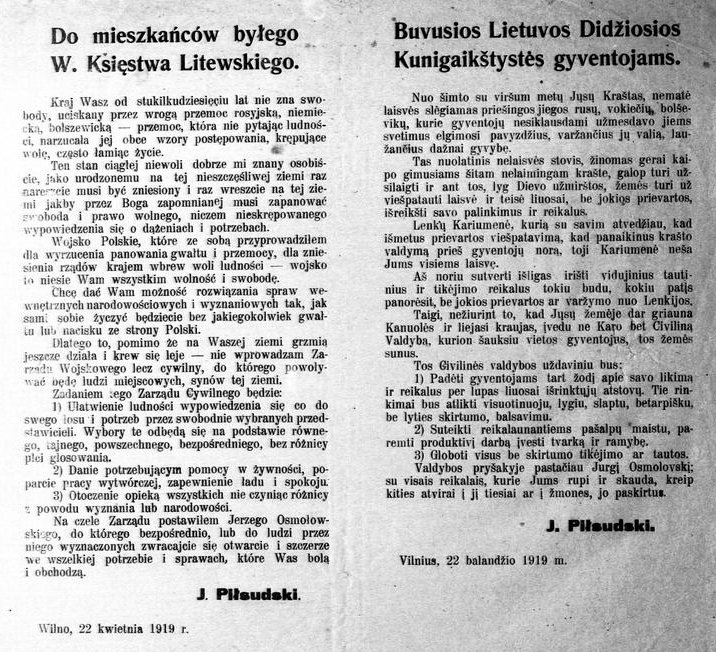
Piłsudski's bilingual "Proclamation to the Inhabitants of the Former Grand Duchy of Lithuania" in Lithuanian and Polish (22 April 1919).

Shortly after the defeat in the Battle of Warsaw in 1920, the withdrawing Red Army handed the city over to Lithuania, following the Soviet–Lithuanian Peace Treaty of 12 July 1920. The treaty allowed for the transfer to Lithuanian authority of some part of the areas of the former Grand Duchy of Lithuania.

The independence of the Baltic states was seen by Lenin as temporary. However, after the Battle of the Niemen River the Red Army was again defeated and Bolshevik Russia was forced to temporary abandon her plans for the reincorporation of all the lands lost by the Russian Empire in the Treaty of Brest-Litovsk.

As Russia ceased to be a major player in the area, Polish-Lithuanian relations worsened. In demographic terms Vilnius was one of the most Polonized and Russified of Lithuanian cities during 1795-1914 Russian rule, with Lithuanians constituting a mere fraction of the total population: 2% - 2,6% according to Russian (1897), German (1916) and Polish (1919) censuses. The latter two indicated that 50,1% or 56,2% of the inhabitants were Poles, while the Jewish share in the population amounted to 43,5% or 36,1% (they were conducted after a large part of the inhabitants of Vilnius were evacuated to Russia, mostly Voronezh because of war in 1915). The Lithuanians nonetheless have a strong historical claim to the city (former capital of the Grand Duchy of Lithuania, the very centre of the formation of medieval Lithuanian state) and refused to recognize any Polish claims to the city and the surrounding area. Lithuanian national activists, for example Mykolas Biržiška and Petras Klimas, supposed Poles and Belarusians in the Vilnius province to be "Slavicized Lithuanians" who, regardless of their individual preferences, must "return to the language of their blood".

After the Bolshevik armies were pushed out of the area, the line reached by the Lithuanian forces before the Poles arrived was secured and diplomatic talks started. However, the negotiations on the future of the disputed area, held under the auspice of the Conference of Ambassadors in Brussels and Paris came to a stalemate and the Polish head of state, Józef Piłsudski feared, that the Entente might want to accept the fait accompli created by the Soviet-Lithuanian Treaty of 1920. As both countries were officially at peace and the Lithuanian side rejected the idea of a plebiscite, the Poles decided to change the stalemate by creating a fait accompli for their own cause (see Polish–Lithuanian War).

On 9 October 1920, the 1st Lithuanian–Belarusian Division under General Lucjan Żeligowski seized the city in a staged mutiny. Vilnius was declared the capital of Republic of Central Lithuania, with Żeligowski as its head of state. The negotiations in Brussels continued, but the Polish move complexified the situation. Among the plans proposed by the Entente was a creation of a Polish-Lithuanian state based on a cantonal system, with shared control over the disputed area. While this was acceptable to both sides, Poland insisted on inviting the Central Lithuanian representatives to the talks. Simultaneously, the Lithuanian politicians argued that Central Lithuania was but a puppet state of Poland and rejected the idea. Finally, the talks came to yet another stalemate and no agreement was reached.

=== Elections in Central Lithuania ===
On 8 January 1922, general parliamentary elections were held in Central Lithuania. Apart from the Lithuanian, Jewish and Belarusian organisations that eventually decided to boycott the voting, Poles, who took part in it supported the incorporation of the area into Poland – with different levels of autonomy. 64.4% of the entire population took part in the voting, and as much as 80.8% of Poles. But among different ethnic groups the turnout was lower (41% of Belarusians, 15.3% Jews, 8.2% of Lithuanians and 66.2% of Tatars and Karaims). This and the frauds noted by the Chief of Military control sent by League of Nations Col. Chardigny in his report were the pretexts for Lithuania not to recognise it. Also, the Lithuanian side argued that the election area covered only the territory of Central Lithuania, that is the areas under Lithuanian administration before Żeligowski's action, while it should also cover the areas promised to Lithuania in the Soviet-Lithuanian Treaty of 1920, known as the Vilnius region.

Group of 32 Lithuanian activists, among them Mykolas Biržiška and Juozapas Kukta were deported to Lithuania on 6 February 1922, they were charged with espionage, what theoretically could be punished with death, but Polish officials just wanted to get rid of the most troublesome individuals, which anti-Polish activity was funded by the government in Kaunas.

At the Central Lithuanian Parliament session on 20 February 1922, the decision was made to annex the whole area to Poland, with Vilnius becoming the capital of the Wilno Voivodship.

The Council of Ambassadors and the international community (except for Lithuania) recognized Vilnius (Wilno) as part of Poland in 1923. The Lithuanian authorities never accepted the status quo and continued to claim sovereignty over the Region of Vilnius. Also, the city itself was declared the constitutional capital of the Lithuanian state while Kaunas was only a temporary capital of Lithuania. Lithuania closed the border and broke all diplomatic relations with Poland. The two countries remained at the de facto state of war until the Polish ultimatum to Lithuania in 1938.

=== Poland ===
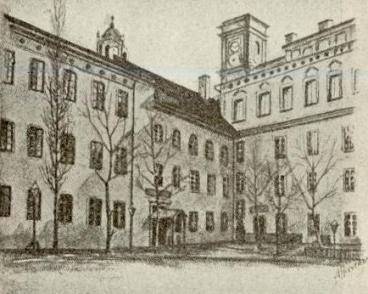
Stefan Batory University

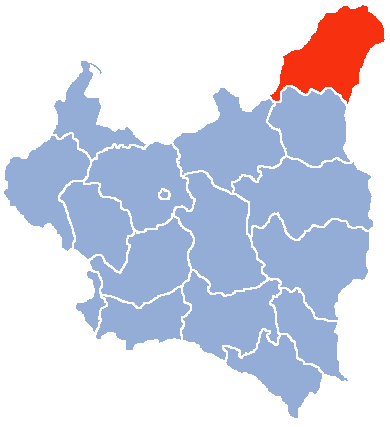
Wilno Voivodship in Poland

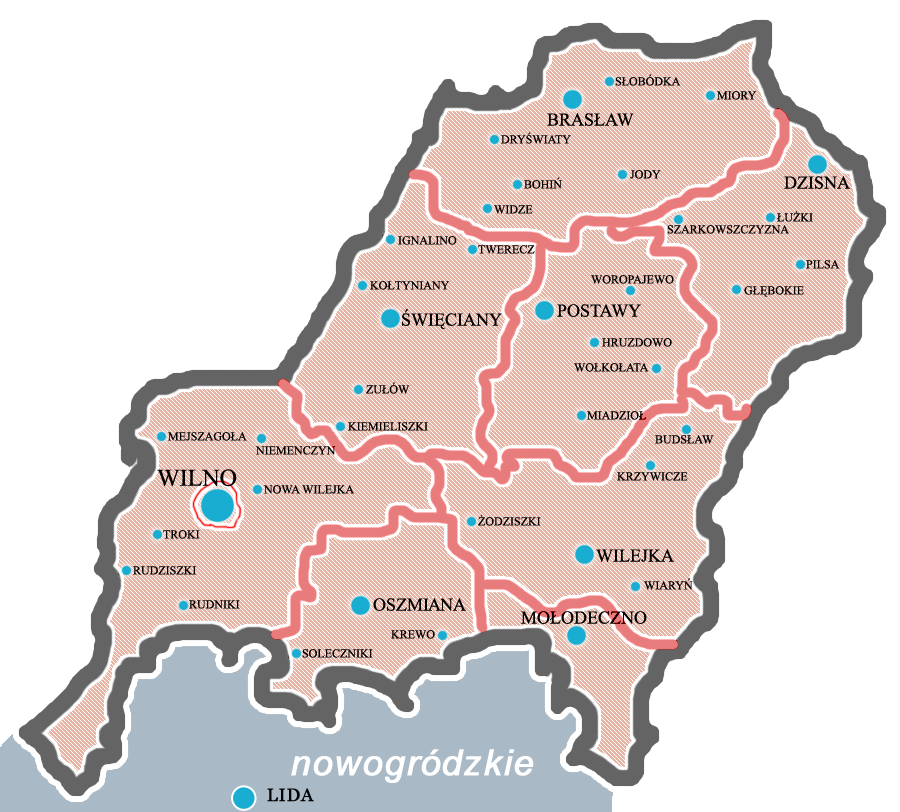
Map of the Wilno Voivodship

Poles together with Jews, made up a majority in the city of Vilnius itself. In the years 1920–1939, according to Polish statistics, Poles made up 65% of the population, Jews 28%, 4% Russians, 1% Belarusians 1% Lithuanians. Most notable cases were political imprisonment of Lithuanian cultural figures in the late 1920s: Petras Kraujalis, Pranas Bieliauskas, Kristupas Čibiras, Vincas Taškūnas, Povilas Karazija, Juozas Kairiūkštis, Vytautas Kairiūkštis, Kostas Aleksa and others, political process of May 1925, where 22 Lithuanians, that were under the threat of the death penalty, but were saved by Tadeusz Wróblewski, etc.

Ghetto benches were introduced at the university of Stephen Bathory. Moreover, members of the Camp of National Unity, which had an absolute majority in the Sejm since 1938, suggested to tractate Belarusians as a constituent part of the Polish nation and to assimilate them. Romuald Jałbrzykowski cooperated with Ludwik Bociański and prohibited Catholic Belarusians to be members of Belarusian societies, thus until World War II only one Belarusian society (Belarusian Beekeepers' Society) remained.

In spite of the unfavorable geopolitical situation (which prevented the trade with the immediate neighbors of Lithuania, Germany and Soviet Russia, life in the town flourished. A new trade fair was created in 1928, the Targi Północne. A number of new factories, including modern "Elektrit" radio factory was opened. Much of the development concentrated along the central Mickiewicz Street, where the modern Jabłkowski Brothers department store was opened, equipped with lifts and automatic doors. New radio buildings and towers were erected in 1927, including the site where noted Polish poet and Nobel Prize winner Czesław Miłosz worked. The city's university was reopened under the name Stefan Batory University, and Polish was reintroduced as the language of instruction. By 1931 the city had 195,000 inhabitants, which made it the fifth-largest city in Poland. The city became an important centre of Polish cultural and scientific life, while economically the rest of the region remained relatively backward. It was claimed that this relative underdevelopment, among other issues, was the reason for difficulties with integrating the region and the city with Lithuania when it regained Vilnius in 1939.

Vilnius was also an informal capital of Yiddish at that time. The Museum of Jewish culture was founded there in 1919, and YIVO – Institute for Jewish Research, was founded there in 1924. Several important Jewish cultural institutions including theatres, newspapers and magazines, museums and schools, and Jewish PEN-Club were created before Second World War in Vilnius. Four YIVO directors emigrated to New York.

==== Situation of Lithuanian minority ====
The Polish administration in the Vilnius Region carried out policy of polonization and ethnocide of Lithuanians, according to the Lithuanian historian Antanas Tyla. The situation of the Lithuanian minority worsened especially during the tenure of the Vilnius Voivode Ludwik Bociański, who, especially from 1936, introduced a policy of repression. On 1936 February 11, a secret anti-Lithuanian memorandum called O posunięciach władz administracji ogólnej w stosunku do mniejszości litewskiej w Polsce oraz o zamierzeniach w tym wględzie na przyszłość (transl. About the actions of the general administration authorities in relation to the Lithuanian minority in Poland and about plans for the future in this regard) was issued by voivode Ludwik Bociański to the Polish administration, which stated the measures for suppressing the Lithuanian minority in Vilnius and the adjacent region, then under Polish control. The execution of the secret anti-Lithuanian document, adopted by voivode Ludwik Bociański, resulted in closure of almost all Lithuanian schools, reading rooms, ban of Lithuanian organizations, while its members were imprisoned or deported. As a result, at the beginning of the 1939/40 school year, Lithuanian education in Poland was limited to the only private primary school and a sole private secondary school, named after Vytautas the Great in Vilnius. In addition, in 102 state common schools with Polish as the language of instruction, Lithuanian language was virtually taught as a subject.

== World War II ==
=== Return to Lithuania ===
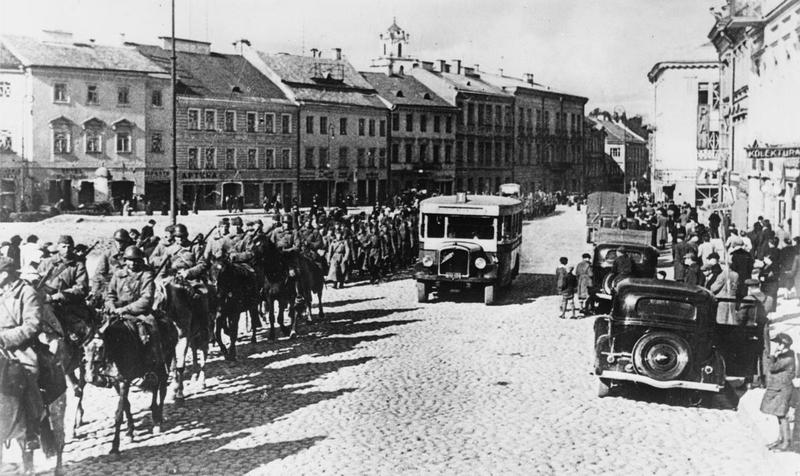
Soviet cavalry entering Vilna on 19 September 1939

At the beginning of the Second World War, Vilnius suffered from continuous German air raids. Despite German pressure, the Lithuanian government categorically declined the suggestions to participate in Germany's aggression against Poland. As a result of the Molotov–Ribbentrop Pact, and subsequent Soviet invasion, the territories of Eastern Poland were occupied by the Red Army, which seized the city following a one-day defence on 19 September 1939. The Soviet Union threatened the Lithuanian side that the city would be incorporated into the Byelorussian SSR in case the Lithuanian side would not negotiate the future status of Vilnius according to the already prepared Soviet agenda.

After talks in Moscow on 10 October 1939, the city and its surrounding areas were transferred to Lithuania according to the Soviet–Lithuanian Mutual Assistance Treaty. In exchange, Lithuania agreed to allow Soviet military bases to be established in strategic parts of the country. Lithuanian envoys were under pressure because at the same time there were talks about attaching the entire Vilnius region to the Belarusian Soviet Republic. Only one-fifth of the Vilnius region was actually given back to Lithuania, even though the Soviets were recognizing the whole region as part of Lithuania when it was still under Polish control. The Polish envoy in Kaunas protested against the unlawful takeover of the city on 13 October and left Lithuania three days later, suspending once again diplomatic relations between both states. This reunited Lithuanian Jews, although some people involved in Soviet activities decided to leave. In few days, over 3000 Jews left Vilnius for the Soviet Union. The Lithuanian army entered Vilnius on 28 October, but it was clear for Lithuanian officials that Vilnius could not be established as a capital without proper preparation. So, for the time being, former Prime Minister Antanas Merkys was named special government representative for the city of Vilnius and the Vilnius region; he was later replaced by Kazys Bizauskas.

A month of Soviet rule in Vilnius had catastrophic consequences: the city was starving, the museums and archives looted, the valuables, industry and historic documents were stolen and transferred to Russia, and many people were imprisoned or deported. Apparently, the Lithuanian government was deliberately slowing down the transfer of the capital back to Vilnius due to fears that the Soviet military presence around the city would enable the Russians to overthrow the Lithuanian government if it were based there.

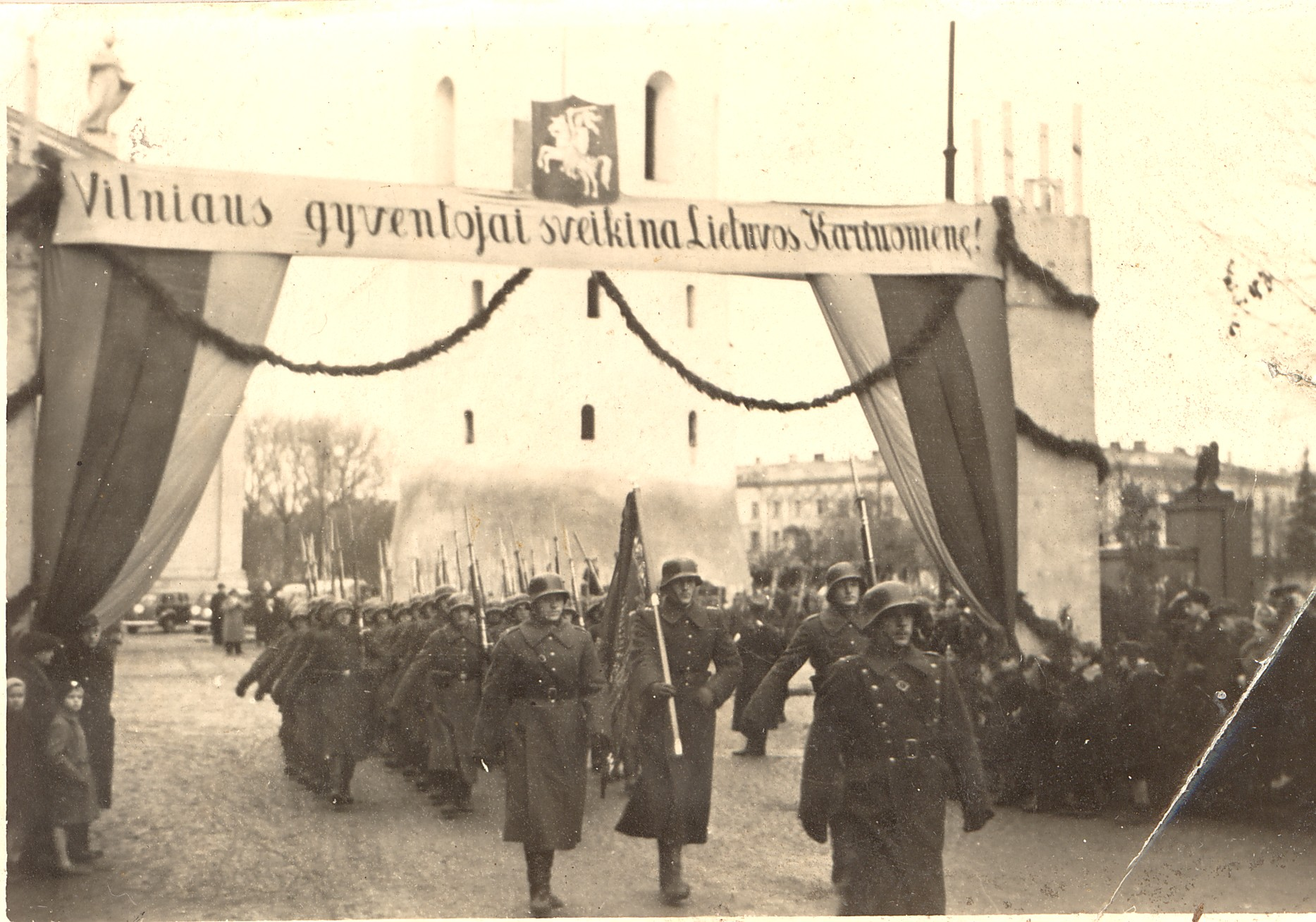
Lithuanian army entering Vilnius

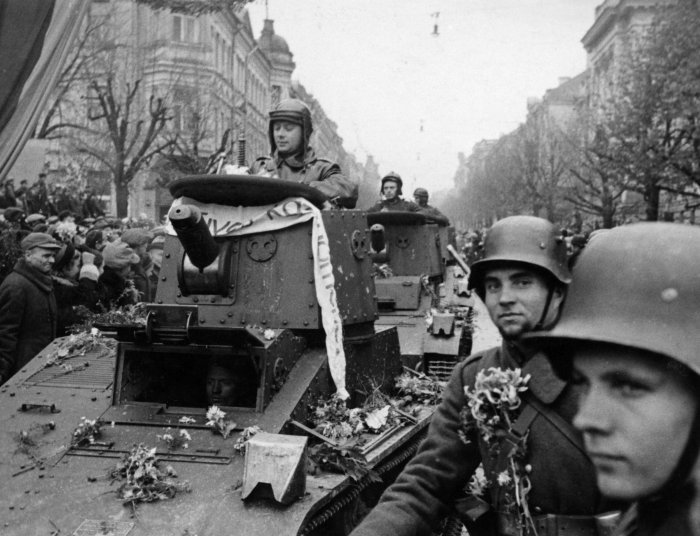
Lithuanian tanks in Vilnius

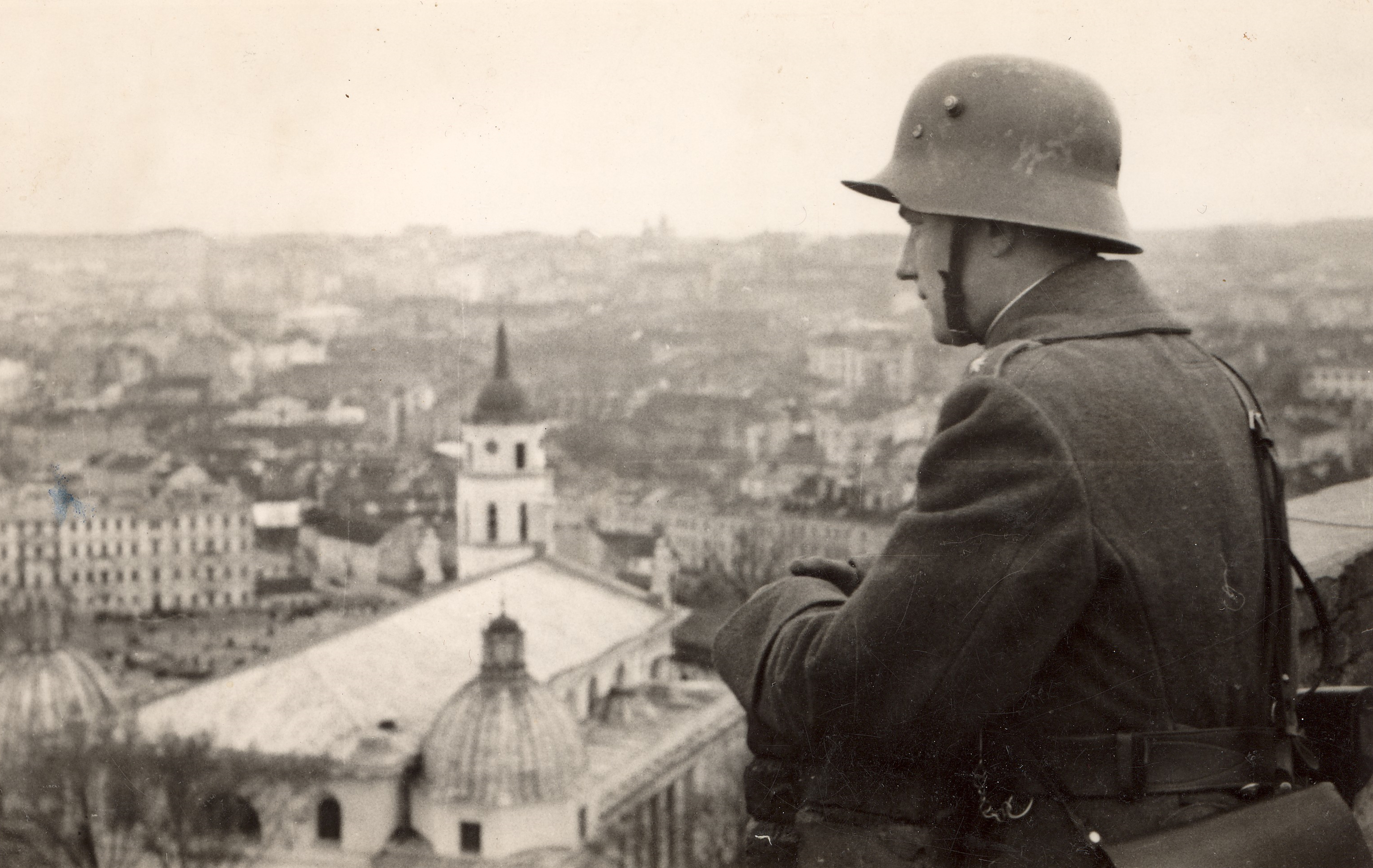
Lithuanian soldier observing Vilnius

The annexation of Vilnius was greeted with rejoicing among Lithuanians; a whole generation was raised in the belief that Lithuania cannot be truly itself without the city of Vilnius – its capital, inscribed in The Act of reestablishment of independent Lithuania and the Constitution of Lithuania, so recent events were commonly perceived as an act of historical justice. The elites were far more concerned; for many, the price Lithuania paid to the Soviet Union for Vilnius was far too high; also they were aware of the demographic situation in Vilnius, and that Lithuanian rule in the city could face fierce resistance. Initially, the first encounter with the Lithuanian army and officials was calm and without any disturbance. Although the Polish bishop of Vilnius Romuald Jałbrzykowski refused to ring the bells of the city's churches. But on the very next day 29 October, clashes between a few Poles, mostly students, and a few Lithuanian policemen erupted, after the Lithuanians hoisted their flag above Gediminas Tower.

After the Lithuanian army entered the city, at the end of October 1939, the demoralized Polish local population started a four-day-long anti-Jewish pogrom, in which one person lost their life and some 200 were wounded.), the Jewish community asked nearby Russian military units for intervention. The violence only stopped after a group of 35 Soviet tanks briefly re-entered the city and put an end to the pogrom. This prevented further pogroms, that were expected on 10–11 November, a traditional day of anti-Jewish disturbances in the city.

The Lithuanian authorities started a campaign of de-occupation and de-Polonization of the city, similar policies also targeted the Jews. Immediately upon entering the city, the Lithuanian authorities abolished the use of Polish złoty (as it was occupied by the Germans and the Soviets, Poland ceased to exist a month earlier and its currency crashed) and ordered the currency to be converted to Lithuanian litas, with only a 250% devaluation. Soon other discriminatory policies followed. During the several months-long period of retaking of Lithuanian capital, which from the Polish point of view was an unlawful occupation, roughly 50,000 Lithuanians (mostly officials of state ministries and their family members) came to the capital city of Lithuanians.

One of the decisions made by Lithuanian authorities in this period was the reformation of the Stefan Batory University into the Vilnius University on 15 December 1939. The same decision was taken in the case of Society of Friends of Science (est. 1907), which had been permitted to function even under the oppressive Tsarist Russia rule and other Polish scientific institutions. In the process of Lithuanization Polish-language books were removed from stores and Polish street names were replaced with new ones in Lithuanian. Polish offices, schools, charitable social and cultural organizations, stores and businesses were closed. By June 1940 only two institutions in the entire city offered instruction in the Polish, while roughly 4000 Polish teachers lost their jobs. The refugees, many of whom were Poles and Jews who moved to the city to avoid being captured by the Germans, were denied free movement, and by 28 March 1940, all people who had not been citizens of the town in October 1920, were declared to be refugees. Altogether, some 12,000 people were granted Lithuanian citizenship, while 150,000 of the city's inhabitants, mostly Poles, were declared foreigners (as more than 100 thousand settled or were settled in Vilnius after the breach of Suwałki Agreement), excluded from many jobs and even prohibited from riding on trains.

=== Soviet occupation ===
The process of moving the capital was not yet finished when in June 1940, despite Lithuanian resistance, Vilnius was again seized by the Soviet Union and became the capital of the Lithuanian SSR. Approximately 35,000 – 40,000 of the city inhabitants were arrested by the NKVD and sent to gulags or deported to Siberia or Kazakhstan at that time.

=== German occupation ===
In June 1941 the city was again seized by Nazi Germany. In the old town centre, two ghettos were set up for the large Jewish population – the smaller of which was "liquidated" by October. The second ghetto lasted until 1943, though its population was regularly decimated in so-called Aktionen. A failed Jewish ghetto uprising on 1 September 1943, could not prevent its final destruction. About 95% of the local Jewish population was murdered. Many of them were among 100,000 victims of the mass executions in Paneriai, about 10 kilometres west of the old town centre. Most of the remaining 30,000 victims of the massacre were Poles – POWs, intelligentsia and members of the Armia Krajowa, which at the time was fighting against both Germans and Lithuanians.

== Soviet occupation ==
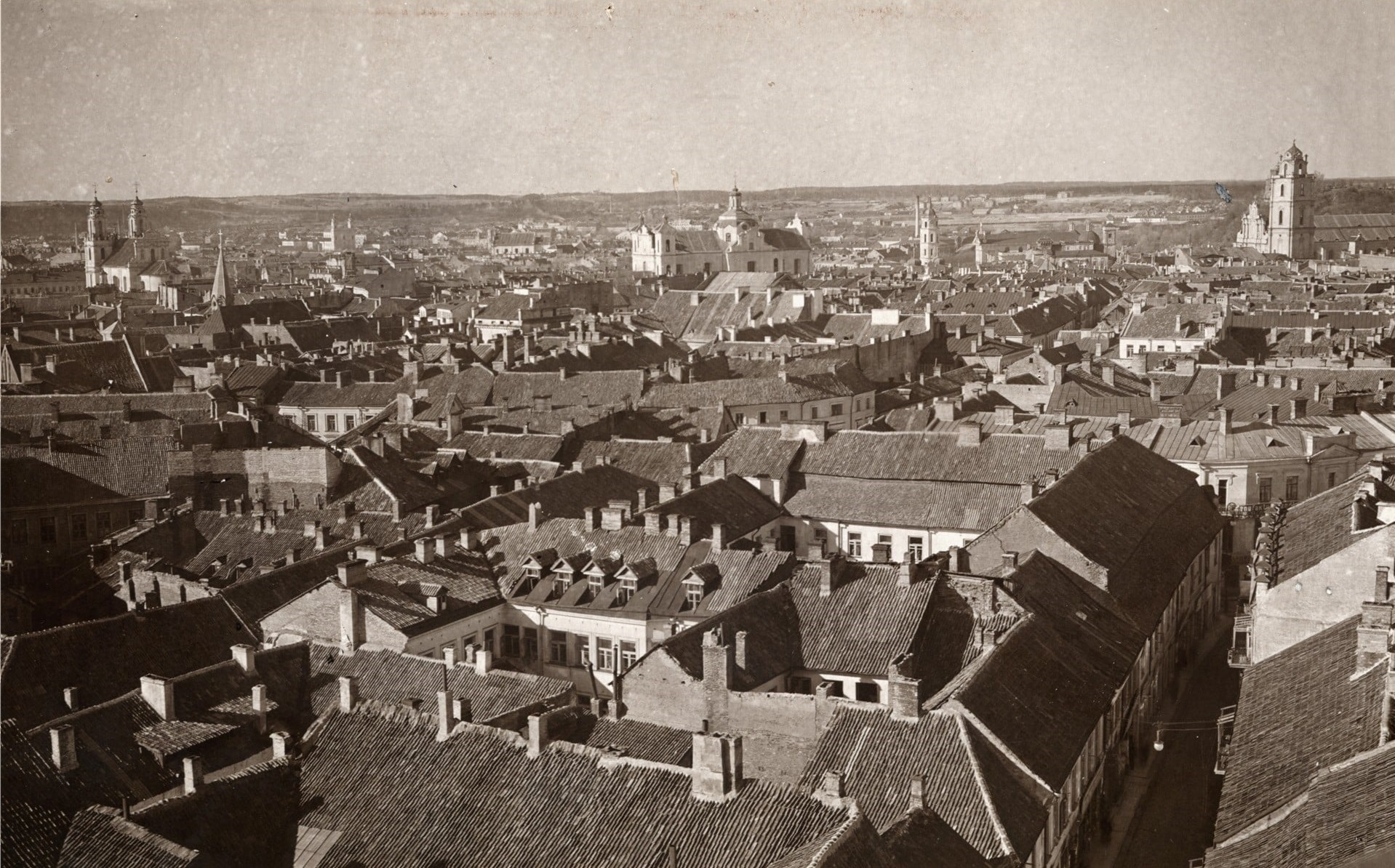
View of the Vilnius Old Town, 1944

The Germans were forced to leave Vilnius in July 1944 by the combined pressure from the Polish Home Army (Operation Ostra Brama) and the Red Army (Battle of Vilnius (1944)). In 1944–1947 the opponents of the regime included were captured, interrogated in the NKVD Palace in Lukiškės Square, executed and buried in the Tuskulėnai Manor park.

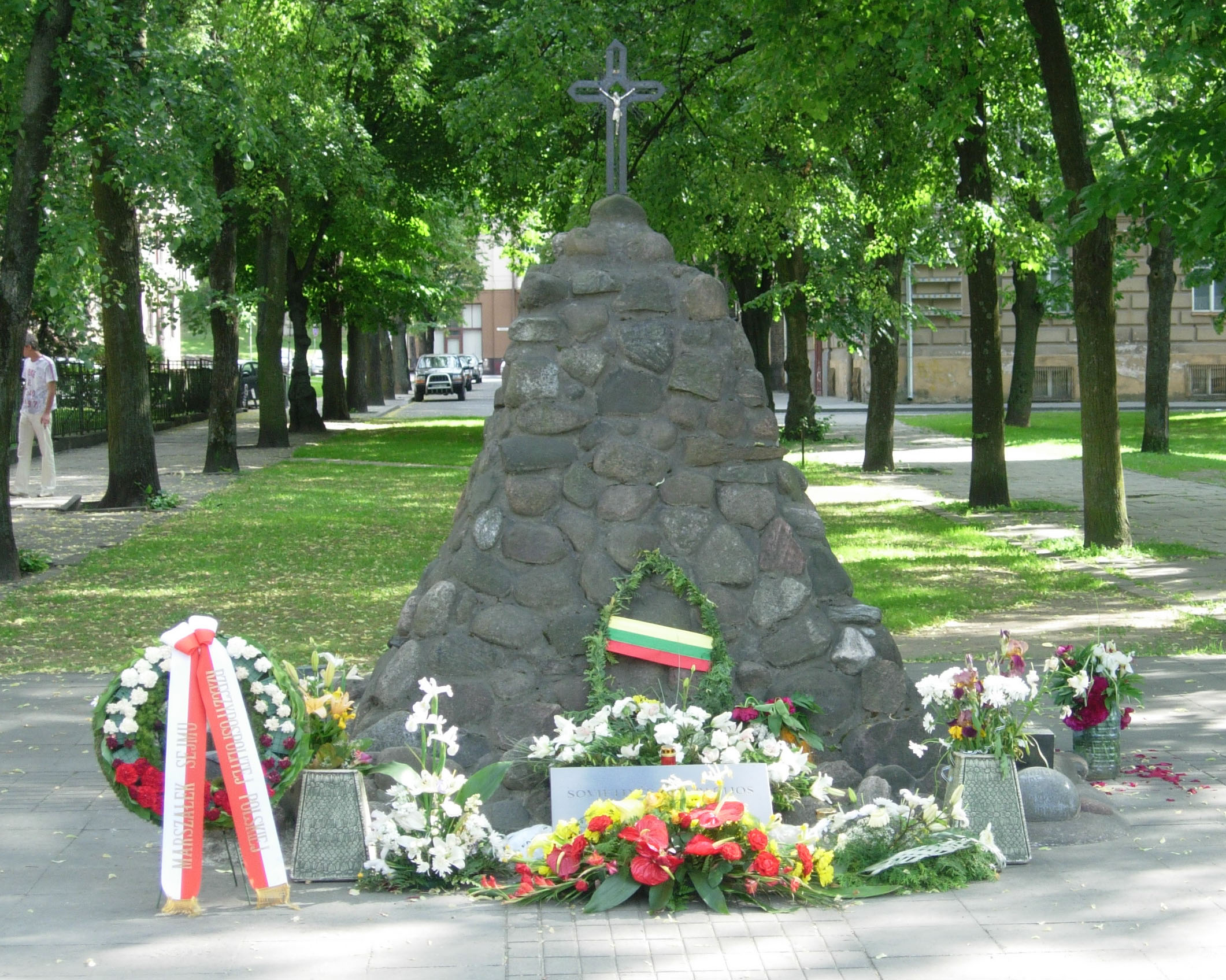
Monument to the victims of KGB terror in Vilnius.

The Soviets decided that Vilnius was to become again part of the Lithuanian SSR. After the end of World War II, the Soviet government unleashed a campaign to move political views further to the Left. It demanded the transferring of Poles from the USSR and decided to transfer the Polish population from Lithuania and Belarus. This decision was soon implemented and most of the population was expelled in an operation organized by Soviet and local communist authorities. In some cases the transfer was voluntary, but not all willing people were able to leave because Poles living in rural areas were forced to remain where they had lived.

Vilnius suffered relatively little wartime damage, and most of its buildings survived the war unscathed. However, the decade after the war, both ghetto areas with the famous Great Synagogue and the northern part of German street, as well as the whole quarter on Pilies street, were torn down.

By the end of the war, only 111.000 people were left in Vilnius (before 1939 the number was circa 200.000), which had an obvious impact on the city's community and its traditions; what before the war was a Polish-Jewish city with a tiny Lithuanian minority was instantly Lithuanized, with Lithuanians becoming the new majority. Many of the remaining Poles were arrested, murdered or sent to gulags or to remote parts of the Soviet Union. These events, coupled with the policy of Russification and immigration of Poles, Russians, Belarusians from other Soviet republics during post-war years, giving rise to a significant Russophone minority, and slow but steady emigration of the surviving Jews to Israel, had a critical influence on the demographic situation of the city in the 1960s. Vilnius experienced a rapid population upsurge due to the inner migration of Lithuanians from the other parts of the country to the capital.

== Independent Lithuania ==
Beginning in 1987 there were massive demonstrations against Soviet rule in the country. On 23 August 1988, 150,000-200,000 people gathered in Vilnius. On 11 March 1990, the Supreme Council of the Lithuanian SSR announced its independence from the Soviet Union and restored the independent Republic of Lithuania. The Soviets responded on 9 January 1991, by sending in troops. On 13 January, during the Soviet Army attack on the State Radio and Television Building and the Vilnius TV Tower, known as the January Events, 14 people were killed and more than 700 were seriously injured. The Soviet Union finally recognized Lithuanian independence in August 1991, after the Soviet coup attempt of 1991.

The importance of Vilnius for Belarus remained at the end of the 20th century. In June 1989 Vilnius was the site of the Belarusian Popular Front conference as the Belorussian Soviet authorities would not allow the event to take place in Belarus. At the beginning of the 21st century, several institutes such as the European Humanities University and the independent sociology centre NISEPI were persecuted in Belarus by the government of Alexander Lukashenko have found an asylum in Vilnius.

In the years following its independence, Vilnius has been rapidly evolving and improving, transforming from a Soviet-dominated enclave into a modern European city in less than 15 years.

In 11–12 July 2023, a NATO summit was held in Vilnius.

== See also ==
- Timeline of Vilnius history
- History of Lithuania
- History of Poland
- Vilnius
- Ethnic history of the Vilnius region
- Lithuanian partisans

== Bibliography ==
- "Vilna", Russia with Teheran, Port Arthur, and Peking, Leipzig: Karl Baedeker, 1914, OCLC 1328163
- Borzecki, Jerzy (2008). The Soviet-Polish Peace of 1921 and the Creation of Interwar Europe. Yale University Press.
- Theodore R. Weeks, FROM "RUSSIAN" TO "POLISH": Vilna-Wilno 1900–1925
- Januszewska-Jurkiewicz, Joanna (2010). Stosunki narodowościowe na Wileńszczyźnie w latach 1920-1939 (in Polish). Katowice: Wydawnictwo Uniwersytetu Śląskiego. ISBN 978-83-8012-603-9.
- Kłos, Juliusz (1937). "Wilno", 3rd ed (in Polish). Wilno.
- (in Polish) Jerzy Remer, Wilno, Poznań
- Łossowski, Piotr (2001). Litwa (in Polish). Warszawa: Trio. ISBN 83-85660-59-3.
- Levin, Don (2005). Żydzi wschodnioeuropejscy podczas II wojny światowej (in Polish). Warszawa: IPN PAN. ISBN 83-7399-117-4.
- Olkowski, Roman (2017). "Walka o rewindykację tzw. dóbr kultury po II wojnie światowej". Muzealnictwo (in Polish). 58: 195–207. doi:10.5604/01.3001.0010.2238.
- Venclova, Tomas (2001). Vilnius – guide. Vilnius: Paknio Leidykla. ISBN 9986-830-47-8.
- Weeks, T. R. (2015). Vilnius between Nations, 1795–2000. Northern Illinois University Press.
