= Timeline of Vilnius =

The following is a timeline of the history of the city of Vilnius, Lithuania.

== Grand Duchy of Lithuania ==
=== 14th century ===
- 1323
  - Gediminas relocates Lithuanian capital to Vilnius from Trakai.
  - Castle on Gediminas Hill expanded.
- 1330 – Coat of arms of Vilnius granted.
- 1345 – Russian Orthodox Church of St. Paraskeva built.
- 1348 – Russian Orthodox Cathedral of the Theotokos built.
- 1387
  - Magdeburg rights granted.
  - Roman Catholic Church of Saint Nicholas built.
- 1397 – Cathedral School active (approximate date).

=== 15th century ===
- 1409 – Gediminas' Tower built.
- 1413 – City becomes capital of the newly formed Vilnius Voivodeship by the Union of Horodło.
- 1426 – Roman Catholic Church of St. Johns built.
- 1469 – Roman Catholic Church of St. Francis and St. Bernardino founded.

=== 16th century ===
- 1500 – Roman Catholic Church of St. Anne consecrated.
- 1501 – First mentions of Armenians in the city.
- 1522
  - City walls and Gate of Dawn built.
  - Francysk Skaryna sets up printing press.
- 1555 – Evangelical Lutheran Church built on Vokiečių Street.
- 1557 – Roman Catholic Vilnius Cathedral rebuilt.
- 1560 – Russian Orthodox Church of St. Paraskeva rebuilt.
- 1570 – Jesuit library established.
- 1572 – Synagogue built.
- 1579 – Alma Academia et Universitas Vilnensis Societatis Iesu founded.
- 1588 – Plague.
- 1597 – Monastery of the Holy Ghost founded.

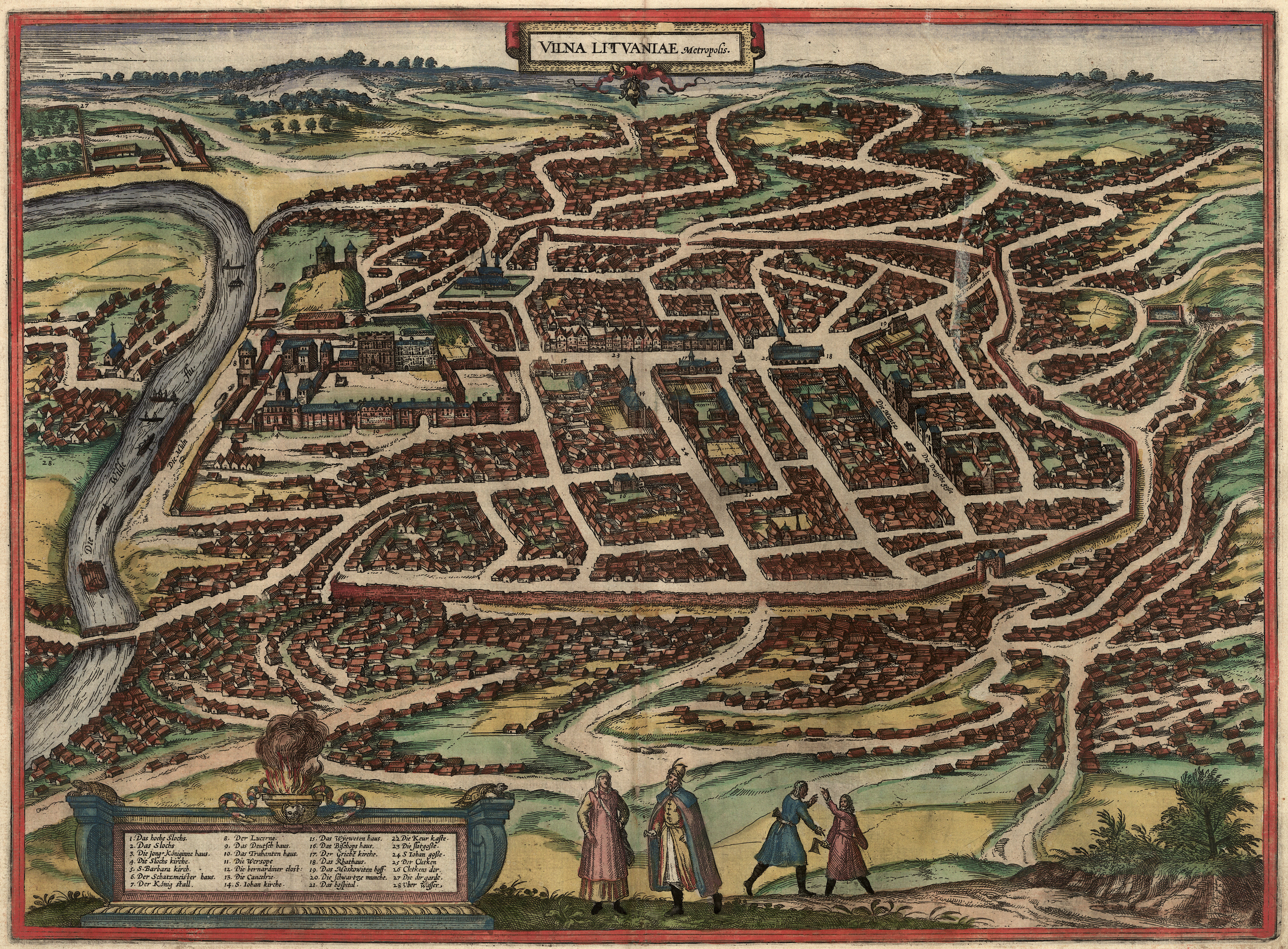
Late-16th-century view of the city

=== 17th century ===
- 1610 – Fire.
- 1626 – Roman Catholic Church of St. Theresa founded.
- 1630 – Roman Catholic Church of All Saints built.
- 1633 – Great Synagogue built.
- 1644 – Biblioteca Sapehana willed to Vilnius University.
- 1653 – Radvila Palace built.
- 1655 – July: Battle of Vilnius; Russian occupation begins, lasting until 1661.
- 1656 – Tsardom of Muscovy declares that it annexed the city mid-war.
- 1658 – Battle of Verkiai.
- 1661 – Vilnius liberated from Muscovite occupation.
- 1697 – Sapieha Palace built.

=== 18th century ===
- 1701 – Roman Catholic Church of St. Peter and St. Paul built.
- 1702 – Swedish occupation.
- 1710 – Plague.
- 1739 – Green Bridge constructed.
- 1749 – Roman Catholic Sanctuary of the Divine Mercy built.

==== 1770s and 1780s ====
- 1778 – Lithuanian 5th Infantry Regiment relocated from Pinsk to Vilnius.
- 1779 – 5th Infantry Regiment relocated from Vilnius to Mścibów.
- 1781 – University Botanical Garden established.
- 1783 – 5th Infantry Regiment relocated from Mścibów back to Vilnius.
- 1787 – Lithuanian 4th Infantry Regiment stationed in Vilnius.
- 1788 – Russians in power.

==== 1790s ====
- 1790
  - 4th Infantry Regiment relocated from Vilnius to Barysaw.
  - Lithuanian 3rd Infantry Regiment relocated from Kaunas to Vilnius.
- 1791
  - Lithuanian 3rd Infantry Regiment relocated from Vilnius back to Kaunas.
  - Lithuanian 7th Infantry Regiment stationed in Vilnius.
- 1794 – Vilnius uprising.

== Long 19th century ==
- 1795
  - City occupied by the Russian Empire. It is designated as the capital of Vilna Governorate.
  - Russian Orthodox Church of St. Paraskeva rebuilt.
- 1799
  - Town Hall rebuilt.
  - Romm publishing house relocates to Vilnius.
- 1801
  - Rasos Cemetery consecrated.
  - Royal Palace demolished.
- 1809 – Antakalnis Cemetery established.
- 1810 – Bernardine Cemetery established.
- 1812
  - Napoleon enters the city, marking the beginning of the brief French period in Lithuania.
  - 1 July: Vilnian National Guard founded in Vilnius.
  - 3 July: 18th Lithuanian Infantry Regiment founded in Vilnius.
  - 5 July: 3rd Light Cavalry Lancers Regiment of the Imperial Guard (Lithuanian) founded in Vilnius.
  - 22 September: 21st Lithuanian Mounted Rifle Regiment founded in Vilnius.

=== 1820s ===
- 1823 – Pop.: 20,900.
- 1825 – Tuskulėnai Manor built.
- 1828 – Jewish cemetery established in Užupis (approximate date).

=== 1830s and 1840s ===
- 1831 – Uprising of 1831 across Lithuania, but Vilnius is not liberated due to the defeat of the rebels at the battle of Paneriai on June 19.
- 1832 – University closed.
- 1834 – Presidential Palace renovated.
- 1836 – St. George Avenue (now Gediminas Avenue) laid out.
- 1845 – Theatre opens.

=== 1850s ===
- 1852 – Central Archive of Early Register Books established.
- 1855 – Museum of Antiquities established.
- 1856 – Public library established.

=== 1860s ===
- 1861 – Demonstration against Russian Empire.
- 1863 – Uprising against Russian Empire.
- 1866 – Orthodox Church of St. Nicholas reconsecrated.
- 1867 – Pretchistenski Cathedral rebuilt.

=== 1880s–1890s ===
- 1881 – Pop.: 89,560.
- 1883 – Pop.: 93,760.
- 1897 – General Jewish Labour Bund founded in Vilnius.
- 1898 – Russian Orthodox Church of St. Alexander Nevsky and District Court built.

=== 1900s ===
- 1900 – Pop.: 162,633.
- 1901 – Kaziukas Fair relocates to Lūkiškės Square.
- 1903 – Power Plant, Choral Synagogue and the Russian Orthodox Church of Our Lady of the Sign built.
- 1904 – Lukiškės Prison built.
- 1905 – December: Great Seimas of Vilnius held.
- 1906
  - Society of Friends of Science organized.
  - Vileišis Palace built.
- 1907 – Lithuanian Art Society founded.

=== 1910s ===
- 1911 – Catholic Church of St. Casimir, Naujoji Vilnia built.
- 1913
  - Russian Orthodox Church of St. Constantine and St. Michael built.
  - Pop.: 204,290.

== World Wars and occupations ==
- 1915
  - 19 September: German occupation begins.
  - City becomes capital of Lithuania District.
- 1916 – Vilna Troupe active.
- 1918
  - 16 February: Lithuania declares independence from German Empire.
  - Museum of History and Ethnography established.

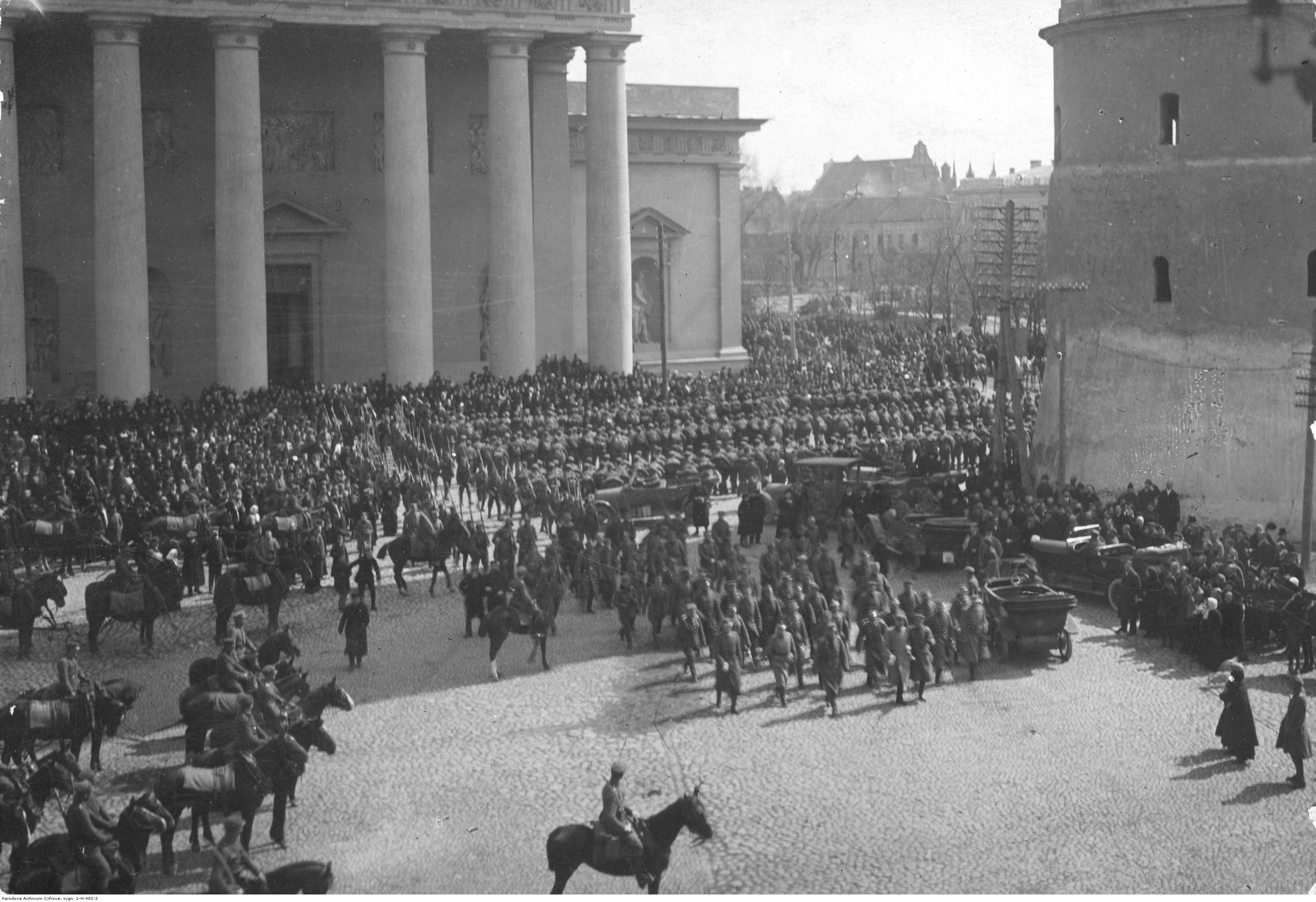
Polish troops in Vilnius following the capture of the city from the Soviets

=== Interwar ===
- 1919
  - April: Vilna offensive by Polish army.
  - Central Library of Lithuania organized.
  - Jabłkowski Brothers department store opens.
- 1920 – October 9: Vilnius occupied by Polish (so-called Central Lithuanian) troops during the Żeligowski's Mutiny.
- 1925
  - Darius Stadium opens.
  - Elektrit Radiotechnical Society, Roman Catholic Metropolitan Archdiocese of Vilnius, and Yiddish Scientific Institute established.
  - 6 May: School massacre.
- 1926 – City becomes capital of Wilno Voivodeship.
- 1928 – Northern Trade Fair begins.
- 1931 – Pop.: 195,000.
- 1933
  - City Museum established.
  - Śmigły Wilno soccer team formed.

=== World War II ===
- 1939
  - 18–19 September: Battle of Vilnius (1939) between the Poles and the invading Soviets at the start of World War II.
  - Soviet occupation of Vilnius.
  - 28 October: Vilnius returned to Lithuania as part of the terms of the Soviet–Lithuanian Mutual Assistance Treaty.
  - Vilnius Pedagogical Institute established.
- 1940
  - City becomes capital of Lithuanian Soviet Socialist Republic.
  - Vilnius State Theatre established.
- 1941
  - June: Germans occupation begins.
  - July: Ponary massacre begins.
  - 5 July: Dulag transit camp for prisoners of war deployed in the city.
  - August: Dulag transit camp for prisoners of war relocated to Lida.
  - August: Subcamp of the Stalag 336 POW camp established by the Germans.
  - 9 September: Subcamp of Stalag 336 converted into the Stalag 344 POW camp.
  - December: Wehrmacht military prison established.
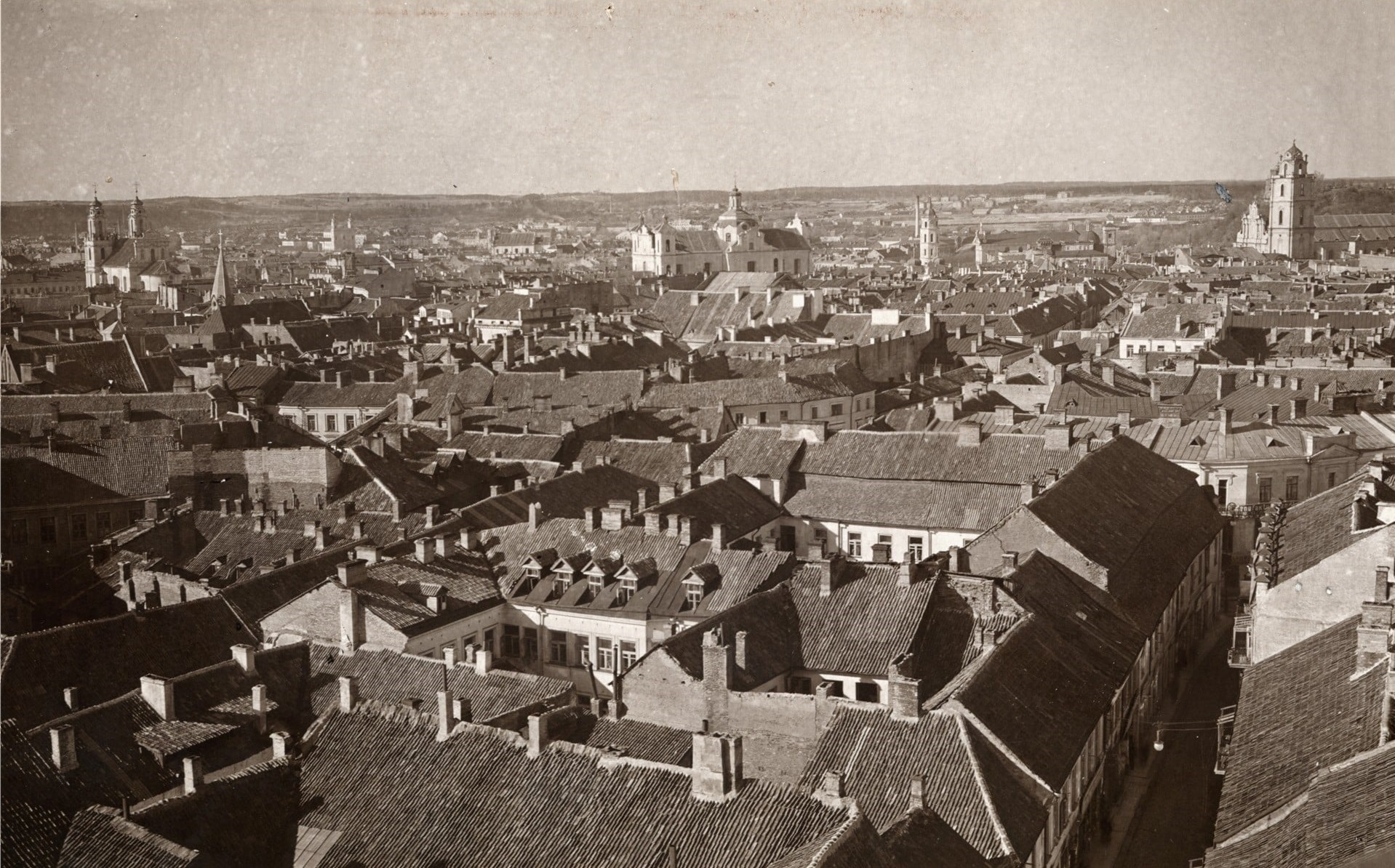
    Old Town in 1944
- 1942 – Fareynikte Partizaner Organizatsye formed in Vilna Jewish Ghetto.
- 1943 – HKP 562 forced labor camp set up by Germans.
- 1944
  - Wehrmacht military prison relocated to Tarnów.
  - 6–15 July: Operation Ostra Brama; Soviet occupation begins.
  - Airport begins operating.

=== Soviet occupation ===
- 1945 – Music School founded.
- 1946 – Russian Drama Theatre re-established.

==== 1950s ====
- 1950 – Žalgiris Stadium opens.
- 1951 – Vilnius Heat Plant commissioned.
- 1955 – Šeškinė village becomes part of the city.
- 1956
  - Trolleybuses begin operating.
  - Vilnius Gediminas Technical University established.

==== 1960s ====
- 1963
  - National Library of Lithuania relocates to Vilnius.
  - Polish Theater founded.
- 1964 – Statyba basketball team formed.
- 1965
  - Žirmūnai Bridge constructed.
  - Vingis Park renovated.
  - Pop.: 293,000.
- 1967 – Technika (publisher) established.
- 1968 – Ratilio ensemble formed.

==== 1970s ====
- 1971 – Palace of Concerts and Sports opens.
- 1972 – Valakampiai Bridge constructed.
- 1974
  - Lithuanian National Opera and Ballet Theatre built.
  - Evangelical Cemetery demolished.
- 1979 – Pop.: 503,000.

==== 1980s ====
- 1980 – Seimas Palace and Vilnius TV Tower built.
- 1983 – Vilnius Combined Heat and Power Plant commissioned.
- 1985 – Pop.: 544,000.
- 1987 – Vilnius Jazz Festival begins.
- 1989 – Jewish State Museum established.

== Independent Lithuania ==
- 1990
  - 11 March: Lithuania declares independence from USSR.
  - Vilnius Lyceum and Vilniaus lietuvių namai (school) established.
- 1991 – January: City besieged by Soviet forces.
- 1992
  - Genocide and Resistance Research Centre of Lithuania and Verkiai Regional Park established.
  - Museum of Genocide Victims opens.
- 1994 – General Jonas Žemaitis Military Academy of Lithuania established.
- 1995 – Alis Vidūnas becomes mayor.
- 1997
  - 1 April: Užupis neighborhood declares itself an independent republic.
  - Rolandas Paksas becomes mayor.
  - Kalnai Park established.
- 1999
  - Vilnius Book Fair begins.
  - Juozas Imbrasas becomes mayor.
- 2000
  - House of the Signatories museum opens.
  - Artūras Zuokas becomes mayor.

=== 21st century ===
- 2001 – Sportima Arena opens.
- 2002
  - Vilnius Ice Palace opens.
  - Energy and Technology Museum established.
- 2003
  - Mindaugas Bridge opens.
  - 750th anniversary of the coronation of Mindaugas.
  - FK Vėtra relocates to Vilnius.
- 2004
  - Siemens Arena and Vetra Stadium open.
  - European Humanities University relocates to Vilnius.
  - Europa Tower built.
  - Mykolas Romeris University and Vilnius Academy of Business Law established.
  - Vilnius Marathon begins.
- 2005 – Lietuvos rytas Arena opens.
- 2006 – May: City hosts regional democracy conference.
- 2007
  - Juozas Imbrasas becomes mayor again.
  - Jonas Mekas Visual Arts Center opens.
- 2008
  - February: City hosts NATO meeting.
  - Vilnius Airport railway station opens.
  - Gariūnai Market pavilion built.
- 2009
  - Palace of the Grand Dukes of Lithuania rebuilt.
  - City designated a European Capital of Culture.
- 2011
  - Vilniaus viešasis transportas (bus company) established.
  - Pop.: 554,060.
  - Artūras Zuokas becomes mayor again.
- 2015 – Remigijus Šimašius becomes mayor.
- 2025
- 2023
  - July: City hosts NATO summit.
- 2026
  - Pop.: 617,984 (city proper) and 747,864 (urban area)

== See also ==
- History of Vilnius
- List of mayors of Vilnius
- Neighborhoods of Vilnius

== Bibliography ==
- Jedidiah Morse; Richard C. Morse (1823), "Wilna", A New Universal Gazetteer (4th ed.), New Haven: S. Converse
- "Wilna", Jewish Encyclopedia, vol. 12, New York, 1907, hdl:2027/osu.32435029752839
- "Vilna (town)" . Encyclopædia Britannica. Vol. 28 (11th ed.). 1910. pp. 88–89.
- "Vilna", Russia with Teheran, Port Arthur, and Peking, Leipzig: Karl Baedeker, 1914, OCLC 1328163
- William Henry Beable (1919), "Vilna", Russian Gazetteer and Guide, London: Russian Outlook
- Patricia Kennedy Grimsted (1979). "The Archival Legacy of the Grand Duchy of Lithuania: The Fate of Early Historical Archives in Vilnius". Slavonic and East European Review. 57.
- Weeks, T. R. (2015). Vilnius between Nations, 1795–2000. Northern Illinois University Press.
- Gembarzewski, Bronisław (1925). Rodowody pułków polskich i oddziałów równorzędnych od r. 1717 do r. 1831. Warszawa: Towarzystwo Wiedzy Wojskowej.
