= Temporary capital of Lithuania =

1920–1939 designation for Kaunas

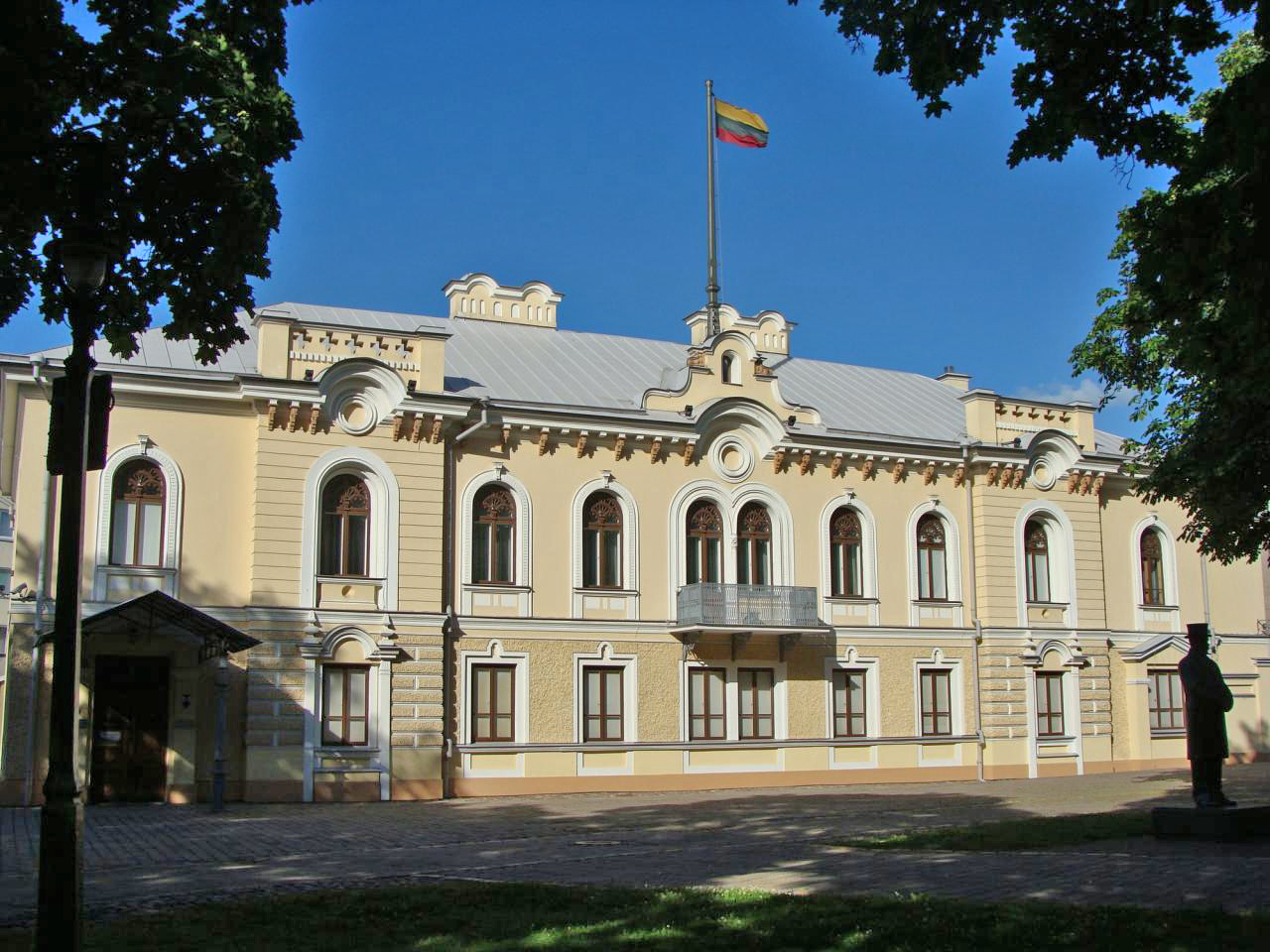
The Historical Presidential Palace in Kaunas

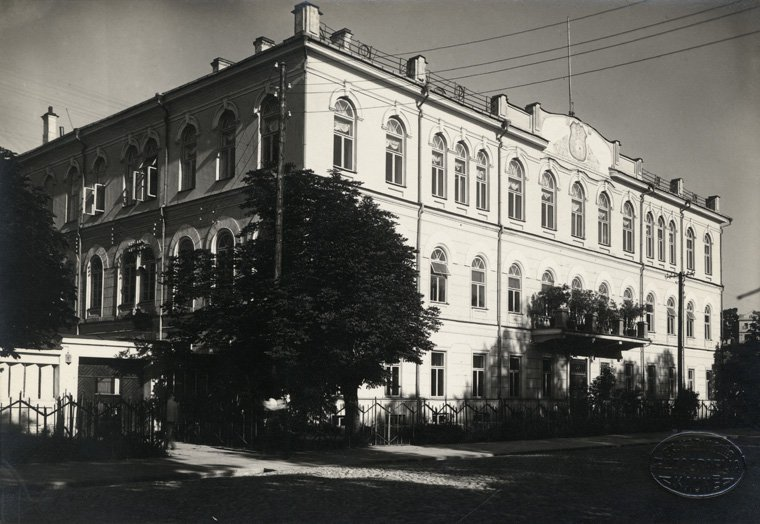
The Constituent Assembly Palace, where the Constituent Assembly and first three editions of Seimas gathered

Palace of Justice and the Seimas, decorated with the Lithuanian tricolors in Kaunas

The temporary capital of Lithuania (Lithuanian: Laikinoji sostinė) was the official designation of the city of Kaunas in Lithuania during the interwar period. It was in contrast to the declared capital in Vilnius, which was the capital of the Republic of Central Lithuania (1920-1922), and part of Poland from 1922 until 1939. Although the term temporary capital is no longer officially used, it remains a common nickname for Kaunas, the second largest city in Lithuania.

On 18 September 2023, the modernist buildings in Kaunas that were built while Kaunas was the temporary capital of Lithuania and experienced rapid urbanization were recognized as a World Heritage Site by UNESCO. With this designation, Kaunas became the only European city representing large scale urbanization during the interwar period and a variety of modern architecture (Art Deco, neoclassicism, traditionalism, functionalism, etc.).

== History ==
=== Vilnius under Polish rule ===
During World War I, Lithuania declared independence on February 16, 1918. The declaration stated that Lithuania would be a democratic republic with Vilnius as its capital. This claim was based on historical grounds, as the city was founded by Lithuanians and later was the capital of the Grand Duchy of Lithuania. However, the city was multi-ethnic and other groups laid similar claims. Belarusians saw it as the capital of the Belarusian nation and laid claims to the heritage of the former Grand Duchy; Jews saw it as the capital of Yiddish culture; Poles saw it as a Polish-inhabited city. At that time, Polish speakers constituted 66% of the city's population, and Lithuanian speakers 0.8%. A part of the Polish speakers in Vilnius supported Lithuania's independence and its claims to capital city Vilnius (e.g. Michał Pius Römer, Stanisław Narutowicz). Tadeusz Wróblewski defended Vilnian Lithuanians who acted against Polish authority in Vilnius.

As Soviet forces pushed westward to spread the global proletarian revolution, German Ober-Ost administration evacuated and the Lithuanians withdrew to Kaunas. Vilnius was captured by the Red Army on January 5, 1919. During the Polish–Soviet War, the city changed hands frequently: on April 19, 1919, the city was seized by the regular Polish Army; on July 14, 1920, it was recaptured by Soviet forces. After the Soviet defeat in the Battle of Warsaw, Vilnius was handed to the Lithuanian authorities according to the Soviet–Lithuanian Peace Treaty of July 12, 1920. Poland continued to claim the city and organized Żeligowski's Mutiny to capture it in October 1920. Polish General Żeligowski established the Republic of Central Lithuania, which was incorporated into Poland in 1922. Such situation remained until 1939. In October 1939, the Soviets transferred the city, which they captured during the invasion of Poland, to Lithuania according to the Soviet–Lithuanian Mutual Assistance Treaty. Since then, Vilnius has been the capital of the Lithuanian SSR and then independent Lithuania.

=== Temporary capital in Kaunas ===
Lithuania refused to have diplomatic relations with Poland until the ultimatum of 1938. Railroad traffic, telegraph lines, and even mail could not cross the Polish–Lithuanian border. Lithuania continued to refer to Vilnius as its capital in all official documents, including the constitution. Since the city was controlled by Poland, all Lithuanian authorities and military command were transferred to Kaunas, which became the seat of the government. To reconcile reality with constitutional claims, Kaunas was designated as a temporary or provisional capital until Vilnius could be "liberated from Polish occupation". In March 1938, Lithuania accepted a Polish ultimatum, demanding diplomatic relations. Despite normalised relations, the new Lithuanian Constitution, in May 1938, still claimed Vilnius as the de jure capital of Lithuania, and Kaunas remained as the temporary capital.

== See also ==
- History of Lithuania
- History of Vilnius
