= 1938 Polish ultimatum to Lithuania =

Pre-WWII diplomatic demand

Map of the territorial disputes of Lithuania in 1939–1940, including the Vilnius Region in brown and orange

The 1938 Polish ultimatum to Lithuania was an ultimatum delivered to Lithuania by Poland on March 17, 1938. The Lithuanian government had steadfastly refused to have any diplomatic relations with Poland after 1920, protesting the annexation of the Vilnius Region by Poland. As pre-World War II tensions in Europe intensified, Poland perceived the need to secure its northern borders. On March 12, Poland, feeling supported by international recognition of the annexation of Austria by Nazi Germany, decided to deliver an ultimatum to Lithuania. The ultimatum demanded that the Lithuanian government unconditionally agree to establish diplomatic relations with Warsaw within 48 hours, and that the terms be finalized before March 31. The establishment of diplomatic relations would mean a de facto renunciation of Lithuanian claims to the region containing its historic capital, Vilnius (Wilno in Polish).

In preferring peace to war, Lithuania accepted the ultimatum on March 19. Although diplomatic relations were established as a result of the ultimatum, Lithuania did not agree to recognize the loss of Vilnius de jure. The government of Poland made a similar move against the Czechoslovak government in Prague on September 30, 1938, when it took advantage of the Sudeten Crisis to demand Trans-Olza, annexed by Czechoslovakia 20 years earlier. On both occasions, Poland used the international crises to address long-standing border disputes.

== Vilnius Dispute ==
Lithuania severed its diplomatic ties with Poland after General Lucjan Żeligowski's mutiny in October 1920 by order of Józef Piłsudski. General Zeligowski invaded Lithuanian-held territory, captured the disputed city of Vilnius and established the short-lived Republic of Central Lithuania. This area was incorporated into Poland in 1922.

At the end of the 19th and in the early 20th century, Vilnius was located outside the Lithuanian ethno-linguistic territory. Demographically, it was the least Lithuanian of Lithuanian cities. Its population was divided nearly evenly between Poles and Jews, with ethnic Lithuanians comprising a small percentage of the inhabitants. According to Russian (1897), German (1916), and Polish (1919) censuses, Lithuanians or Lithuanian speakers constituted 2–2.6% of the city's population. During the interwar period, the Lithuanian side, while admitting that there were few Lithuanians living in Vilnius, claimed it on historical grounds – as the former capital of the Grand Duchy of Lithuania.

Lithuania demanded Polish troops withdraw behind the line established by the Suwałki Agreement. Poland officially rejected Żeligowski's actions. The league attempted to mediate the dispute and Paul Hymans presented concrete proposals to form a federation. However, both sides were unwilling to make compromises and negotiations collapsed in January 1922. In January 1923, Lithuanian troops crossed over to the Allied-held Memelland and staged the Klaipėda revolt. It was one of the main factors that led to the decision of the Conference of Ambassadors to award Vilnius to Poland in March 1923.

The result was a state of "no war, no peace" as Lithuania avoided recognising any Polish claims to the city and the region, as well as refusing to undertake any actions that would recognise Poland's control of Vilnius even de facto. Hence, Lithuania broke off all diplomatic relations with Poland and continuously emphasised that Vilnius remained its permanent capital (Kaunas was designated as the temporary capital).

Poland refused to formally recognise the existence of any dispute regarding the region, since that would have lent legitimacy to the Lithuanian claims. Railroad traffic and telegraph lines could not cross the border, and mail service was complicated. For example, a letter from Poland to Lithuania needed to be sent to a neutral country, repackaged in a new envelope to remove any Polish signs and only then delivered to Lithuania.

The conflict over Vilnius remained the most important foreign policy issue in Lithuania, but it became increasingly marginalized in the international arena. There were unsuccessful informal attempts to normalise the situation; most notably by the Lithuanian Prime Minister Augustinas Voldemaras, between 1927 and 1928; and by Foreign Minister Stasys Lozoraitis, between 1934 and 1936, who asked President Smetona to re-establish diplomatic relations with Poland. Both sides engaged in emotional and nationalistic rhetoric.

== Rationale ==
On March 11, 1938, (Note: Sometimes incorrectly cited as March 7.) a day before Austria was annexed into Greater Germany following the Anschluss, Justas Lukoševičius, a Lithuanian border guard shot Stanisław Serafin, a Polish soldier, on the demarcation line in the village of Trasninkas near Merkinė. The exact circumstances are not clear; the obscure event was variously portrayed as a Lithuanian provocation, a Polish provocation, or an accident. Between 1927 and 1938, seven Lithuanian border guards had been killed in 78 similar events. Usually, such incidents were handled at the local level in an attempt to forestall escalation. On this occasion, however, Polish radio and newspapers picked up the story and fanned anti-Lithuanian sentiment. Protests were held in Warsaw, Vilnius, and four other cities where the crowds shouted for military action against Lithuania. There is evidence that the Camp of National Unity was involved in organising the protests.

On March 13, 1938, the Polish government issued a threatening statement accusing Lithuania of provocation. The following day, the Senate of the Republic of Poland called for the establishment of diplomatic relations and for the Lithuanian renunciation of claims to Vilnius. Upon receiving news that Poland was considering extreme measures, President Smetona was verging towards agreeing to discuss diplomatic relations. He changed his mind at the last minute.

On the night of March 14, the Lithuanians, acting through France's envoy to Warsaw, proposed a commission to investigate the shooting incident and to agree on measures to avoid such incidents in the future. This was a partial measure that clearly did not satisfy Poland, who responded by refusing, in the first paragraph of the ultimatum delivered three days later, to establish such a commission. At the same time, Lithuanian diplomats approached foreign powers in a bid for international support.

== Initial version ==
The first version of the ultimatum, as drafted by Edward Rydz-Śmigły, Prime Minister Felicjan Sławoj Składkowski, and Jan Szembek, contained six demands:

1. Establish normal diplomatic and consular relations with Poland
2. Allow normal railway and road traffic and direct telephone and telegraph lines across the demarcation line
3. Amend the Lithuanian constitution to acknowledge that Vilnius was no longer the capital of Lithuania
4. Conclude the convention protecting the rights of the Polish minority in Lithuania in full
5. Conclude a trade and tariff agreement
6. Fully investigate the incident in Trasninkas

The Polish Foreign Minister Józef Beck, who had just returned from a trip to Sorrento, called for a government meeting on the night of March 16. During the meeting, he argued that the ultimatum needed to contain only one demand: the establishment of diplomatic relations. In his view, such an ultimatum would not have violated any genuine Lithuanian interests and would offer much-improved prospects for peaceful resolution of the conflict and a speedy relief of tension. It was in accordance with Beck's vision for Eastern Europe, which was based on a Warsaw-dominated Polish–Baltic–Scandinavian bloc free of Soviet or German influence, a modified version of Józef Piłsudski's Międzymorze, which required the normalisation of relations with Lithuania. The removal of the other demands also reflected political pressure on Poland from the Soviet Union, France and the United Kingdom to prevent the conflict from escalating into warfare.

The Polish government agreed to Beck's proposal and the ultimatum was toned down. However, at the same time, Beck ordered military preparations. Poland assembled four divisions along the demarcation line; about 50,000 Polish troops were present and just over 20,000 Lithuanian troops. The Polish troops were reinforced by armoured vehicles, by two air force regiments, consisting of about one hundred aircraft, and by the Polish fleet in the waters of the Baltic Sea along the Lithuanian shore.

== The ultimatum ==
The final text of the ultimatum, completed by Józef Beck and delivered through a Polish envoy in Tallinn to Bronius Dailidė, the Lithuanian envoy in Tallinn, was as follows:

1. The proposition of the Lithuanian Government of 14 March cannot be accepted for it does not give sufficient guarantees concerning the security of the frontier in view of the negative results of all Polish–Lithuanian negotiations made up to the present time.

2. For this reason the Polish Government declares that it considers as the only solution corresponding to the gravity of the situation the immediate establishment of normal diplomatic relations without any previous condition. This is the only way to regulate the neighbourly questions for a Government animated by good faith to avoid events dangerous to peace.

3. The Polish Government allows the Lithuanian Government 48 hours from the moment the note is presented for the acceptance of this proposition in making it known that diplomatic representations at Kaunas and Warsaw will be accredited not later than March 31, of this year. Until that date, all discussions of a technical or other character between the Polish and Lithuanian Governments shall be continued by the envoys extraordinary and ministers plenipotentiary at Tallinn.
The exchange of notes attached concerning the establishment of diplomatic relations shall take place, before the expiration of the period of 48 hours mentioned, at Tallinn between the Polish and Lithuanian Ministers at Tallinn.

4. The proposition above mentioned will not be the subject of discussion with regard to its content or form—it is an unchangeable proposition.
The failure to respond or the presentation of any supplements or reservations shall be considered by the Polish Government as a refusal. In the event of a negative reply the Polish Government will guarantee the just interest of the state by its proper means.

The ultimatum contained an attachment: a draft of what would be deemed an acceptable response to the ultimatum. The proposed response stated only that Lithuania agreed to establish regular diplomatic relations, send a legation to Warsaw and guarantee normal conditions of operation for a Polish legation in Kaunas.

== International reaction ==
After the Soviet–Lithuanian Peace Treaty was ratified in 1920, the Russian SFSR recognised Lithuanian claims to the Vilnius Region and continued to support them. In its responses to the 1938 ultimatum, the Soviet Union threatened to abrogate the Soviet–Polish Non-Aggression Pact of 1932. It made it clear, though, that it did not wish to be drawn into an armed conflict. This stance has been attributed to the growth of a threat from Japan; armed assistance to Lithuania would have required the Red Army to invade either Poland or Latvia and could have resulted in a war on two fronts. The Soviets urged France, a major ally of Poland at the time, to de-escalate the conflict and encourage a more moderate version of the ultimatum. France and the United Kingdom, preoccupied with the Anschluss, pressured Lithuania to normalise the relationship with Poland as soon as possible. They feared that the ultimatum had been approved by Nazi Germany.

Germany, led by Adolf Hitler, now turned its attention to the Klaipėda Region, then held by Lithuania. In April 1938, Hitler stated that control of the Port of Klaipėda (German: Memel) and its surrounding area was Germany's second-most important issue, following the status of the Sudeten area. In the event of armed hostilities between Poland and Lithuania, German troops were to defend and occupy the Klaipėda region and significant portions of western Lithuania. The Polish ambassador to Nazi Germany, Józef Lipski, was informed of these plans. The Poles agreed to cooperate with German troops and to respect German interests in Klaipėda if such an armed conflict were to arise. However, in Hitler's assessment, an immediate bid for Klaipėda was impolitic; he wished to maintain the status quo until more time had passed after the Anschluss. The German suggestion was that Lithuania concede to the Polish demands.

Lithuania, Latvia, and Estonia, the three Baltic states, had formed the Baltic Entente in 1934. Its principal purposes were coordination of joint foreign policy and mutual international diplomatic support; it was not a military alliance. In Latvian and Estonian opinion, the Polish–Lithuanian dispute over Vilnius was outside the scope of the Entente, but they wished for a resolution, considering the conflict detrimental to the stability of the region. Latvia attempted to persuade Estonia to exert mutual pressure on Lithuania for a speedy acceptance of the ultimatum. This reaction from an ally was unexpected.

== Acceptance ==
President Smetona held a government meeting late on the night of March 18, 1938, to decide whether to accept the ultimatum. Lithuania clearly lacked international support and the demand was rather tame. A refusal would have cast Lithuania in an unfavourable light as an unreasonable disputant that had irrationally rejected peaceful diplomatic relations for eighteen years. Lithuanian diplomats were divided on the issue, while popular opinion was strongly against accepting the ultimatum. Various campaigns for the Lithuanian liberation of Vilnius had attracted massive participation. "Mourning of Vilnius Day" (October 9, when Żeligowski invaded Lithuania and captured Vilnius), had become an annual event, and the largest social organisation in interwar Lithuania was the Union for the Liberation of Vilnius, with some 25,000 members.

Passionate feelings about Vilnius were expressed in a popular slogan "Mes be Vilniaus nenurimsim" (we will not calm down without Vilnius), part of a poem by Petras Vaičiūnas. While Paul Hymans' regional peace plans at the League of Nations were under negotiation, Lithuanian Prime Minister Ernestas Galvanauskas barely survived an assassination attempt.

A government decision to open over 80 Polish schools in Lithuania was a probable factor in the 1926 Lithuanian coup d'état. Any government making concessions to Poland at that time risked an ouster.

President Smetona received memoranda from nine nationalistic organisations urging the government to reject the ultimatum. However, a decisive comment was made by General Stasys Raštikis, the commander of the Lithuanian army. He testified that a military victory over Poland was impossible and argued for a peaceful resolution. The government's decision was confirmed by the Fourth Seimas with minimal discussion. On March 19, Dailidė relayed acceptance of the ultimatum to the Poles, who gave a 12-hour extension to decide on the ultimatum as a show of good faith.

== Aftermath ==
The ultimatum contributed to the general atmosphere of tension and fear in Europe. It relieved some of the pressure on Germany that had arisen in the aftermath of the Anschluss and tested the Soviets' willingness to defend their interests in Eastern Europe. Fears were expressed, both in Lithuania and abroad, that the establishment of diplomatic relations was not the only goal of Warsaw and that more far-reaching ultimata might follow. Speculations arose that Poland might seek to resurrect the Polish–Lithuanian Commonwealth, using Germany's annexation of Austria as a precedent.

Poland announced that it planned to create a neutral bloc comprising Poland, Lithuania, Latvia, Estonia, and Romania to counter both fascism and communism. It stated that it had no wish to incorporate Lithuanian territories and maintained that the bloc would be formed on the basis of bilateral non-aggression and economic treaties. According to The New York Times, the impact of the ultimatum was felt on Wall Street; on March 17, the foreign currency and bond markets sagged, in some cases reaching the lowest points seen in several years. These markets recovered on March 19, after the ultimatum was accepted.

The acceptance triggered a government crisis in Lithuania: on March 24, Prime Minister Juozas Tūbelis, who held uncompromising positions over Vilnius and at the time of the ultimatum was undergoing medical treatment in Switzerland, stepped down. His successor, Vladas Mironas, who was in favour of normalising relations with Poland, assembled a new cabinet of ministers. Despite increasing pressure to form a broader coalition, the new cabinet was composed solely of members of the Lithuanian Nationalists Union. The unconditional acceptance hurt Lithuanian pride and damaged the reputation of the party. The suppressed opposition used this damage as an opportunity to renew its activities and formed a group called Ašis (Axis). In Poland, the acceptance was greeted with enthusiasm, described as a "great bloodless victory", and celebrated by a military march in Vilnius.

A few days after the ultimatum, both Lithuania and Poland named their ambassadors. Kazys Škirpa was sent to Warsaw, and Franciszek Charwat was sent to Kaunas before March 31, the deadline indicated in the ultimatum. Negotiations over practical matters began on March 25, in Augustów, and by June three agreements covering rail transit, mail service, and river navigation had been concluded.

The railway, torn apart for several kilometers at the border, was repaired. A customs post was established in Vievis, and consulates were opened in Klaipėda and Vilnius. Lithuania closed the League for the Liberation of Vilnius and the Vilnius Foundation; the latter organization had given financial support to Lithuanian activities in the Vilnius Region. Nevertheless, Lithuania continued to claim Vilnius as its de jure capital. In May 1938 a new constitution was adopted, which echoed the previous constitution's statement that Vilnius was the permanent capital of Lithuania and that Kaunas was merely a temporary capital. Poland continued to suppress Lithuanian organisations in Vilnius.

A thaw in Polish–Lithuanian relations began in spring 1939. After the German–Czech and German–Lithuanian crises, Poland made more active efforts to ensure Lithuania's assistance, or at least neutrality, in the event of a war with Nazi Germany. Lithuanian General Stasys Raštikis and Polish Foreign Minister Józef Beck made high-profile visits to each other's countries, and Poland improved the conditions of Lithuanians in the Vilnius Region. However, Lithuania did not believe that Poland and its western allies were strong enough to resist Germany and the Soviet Union. When Germany invaded Poland in September 1939, Lithuania maintained a policy of strict neutrality, refusing repeated German offers for a joint attack on Poland to capture Vilnius. Instead, Lithuania interned about 15,000 Polish soldiers and accepted about 35,000 Polish civilian refugees. The Soviet Union returned Vilnius to Lithuania after the Soviet invasion of Eastern Poland in September 1939. Neither country was aware at the time of the secret protocols of the Molotov–Ribbentrop Pact, signed in August 1939, in which Germany and the Soviet Union agreed to divide the region into their spheres of influence. In June 1940, the Soviet Union occupied and annexed Lithuania in accordance with the Molotov–Ribbentrop Pact. A year later Russia was attacked by Nazi Germany leading to the Nazi occupation of Lithuania.

== Poland and Czechoslovakia ==
Poland made a similar move against Czechoslovakia in Prague on September 30, 1938. In this instance, Poland took advantage of the Sudeten Crisis to demand a portion of Trans-Olza. On both occasions, Poland used international crisis to address long-standing border disputes.
