= Technika (publisher) =

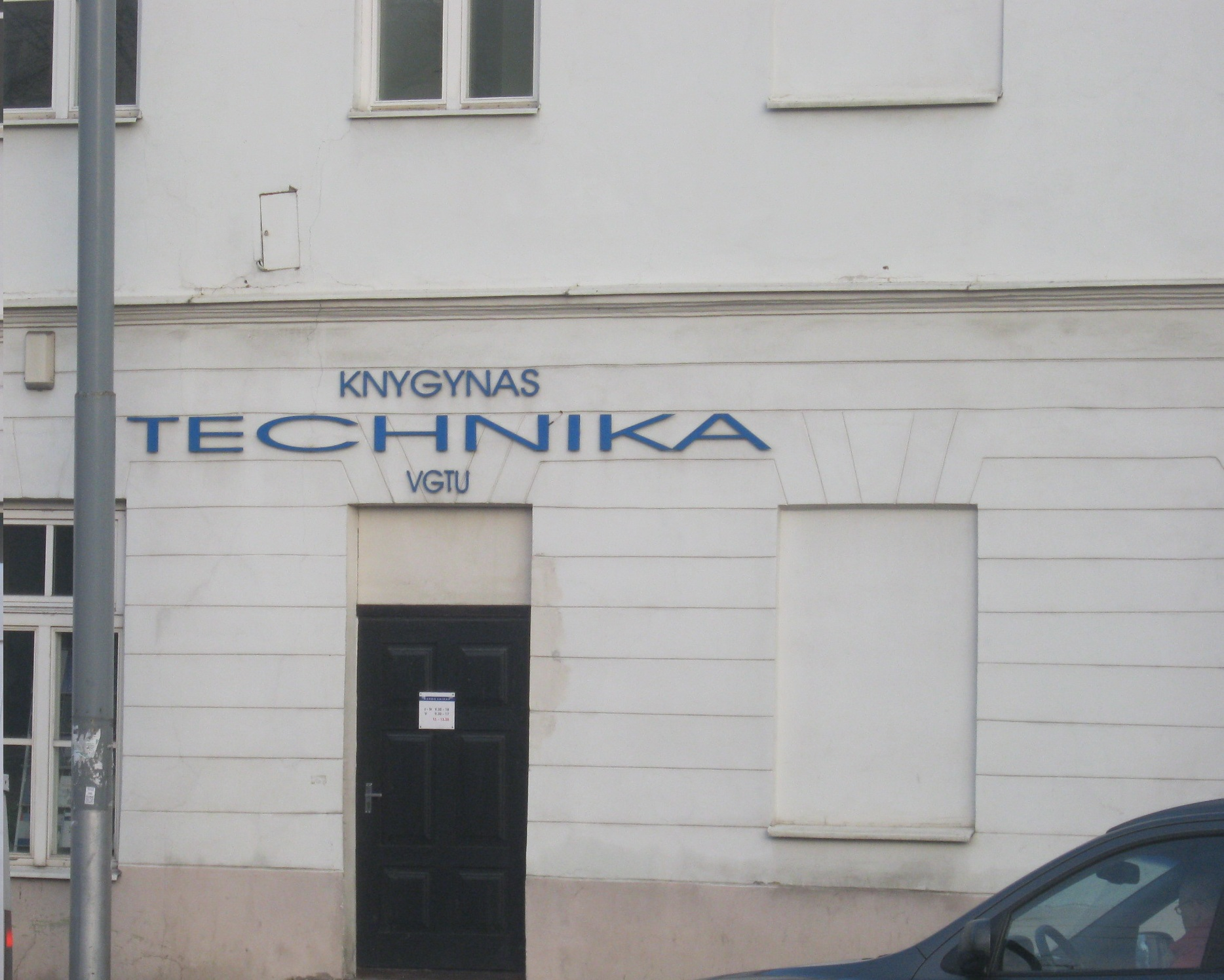
Technika bookstore

Technika is a university press department of Vilnius Gediminas Technical University (VGTU), Lithuania.

The publishing house was established in 1967 for publishing scholarly literature. Among the scientific publications there are internationally well-known research journals concerning different fields of science: technological sciences (10 journals), social sciences (4 journals) and humanities (3 journals). Both Lithuanian and foreign scientists publish their research papers in VGTU journals. All the research journals published by VGTU are abstracted by international databases of scientific information. Seven of them are referred by Thomson Reuters (ISI Web of Science).

In 2008 Technika published over 277 issues of scientific books, including textbooks and educational books, etc. All publications of Technika are peer reviewed and edited.
