= Gediminas Avenue =

Main street of Vilnius, Lithuania

Coordinates: 54°41′14″N 25°16′40″E

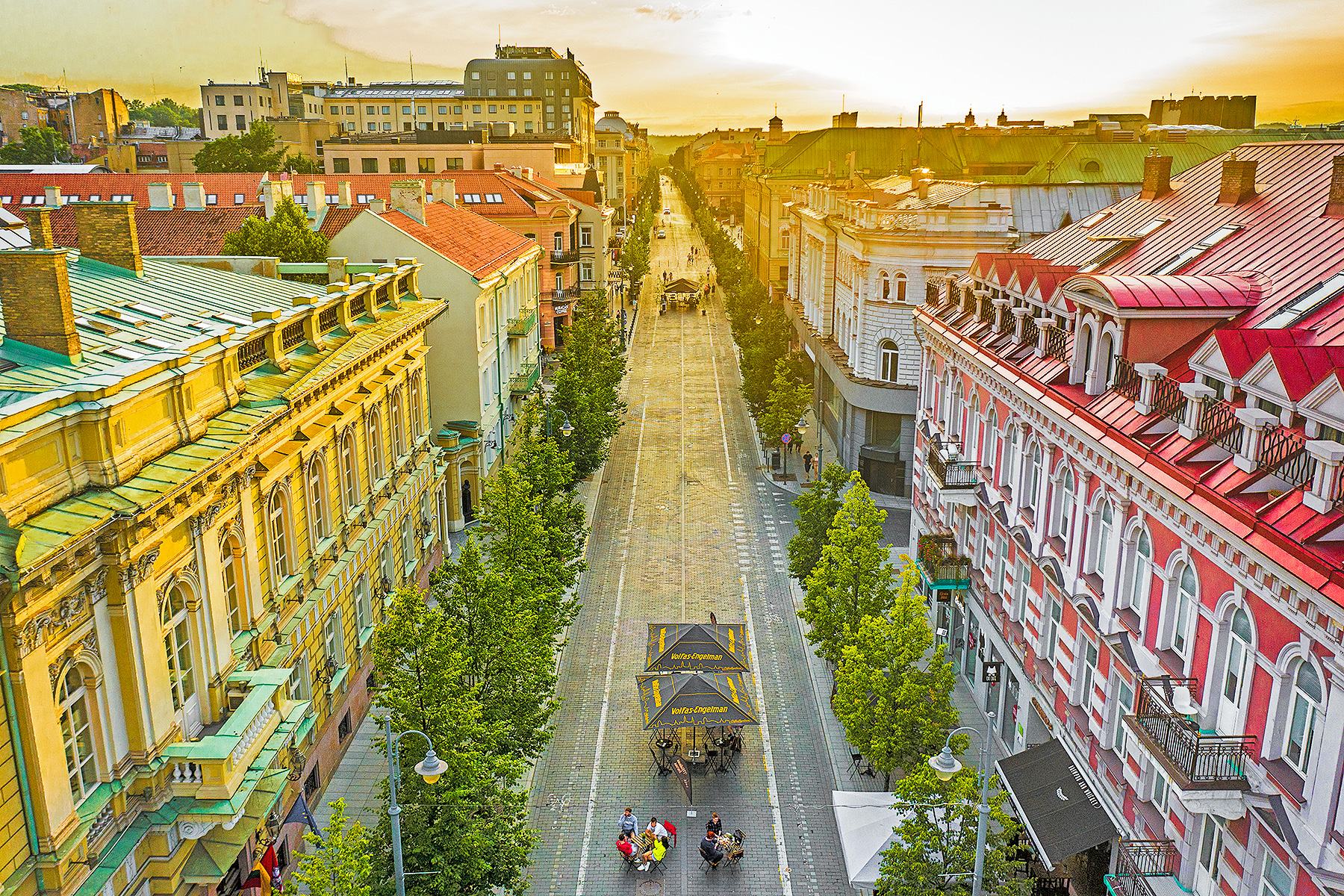
Gediminas Avenue as seen from the Cathedral Square

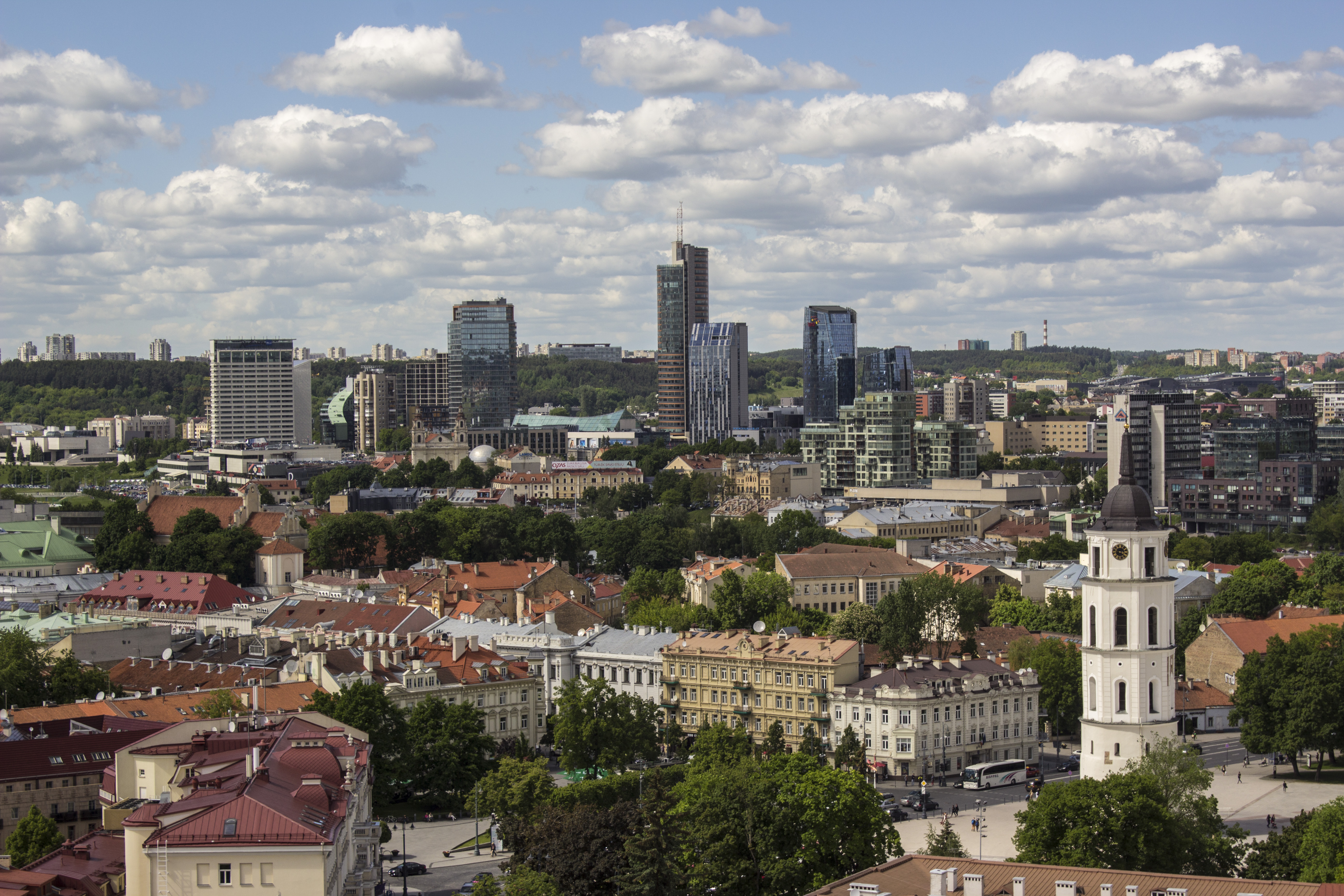
Rooftops of the Gediminas Avenue and the Vilnius Cathedral Bell Tower

Gediminas Avenue (Lithuanian: Gedimino prospektas) is the main street of Vilnius, where most of the governmental institutions of Lithuania are concentrated, including the government, parliament, Constitutional Court and ministries. It is also the location of cultural institutions such as the Lithuanian National Drama Theatre, Bank of Lithuania, Lithuanian Academy of Music and Theatre and Martynas Mažvydas National Library. It is also a popular shopping and dining street, with the highest average rent prices in the country. It is partially a pedestrian street in the evenings when traffic is prohibited.

Named after the Grand Duke of Lithuania Gediminas, the street terminates at the Žvėrynas Bridge over the Neris River near Seimas Palace on one end and at the Cathedral Square and Vilnius Castle Complex on the other, passing Lukiškės Square where the Museum of Occupations and Freedom Fights is located in the former KGB building. It connects the Old Town with Žvėrynas.

== History ==
The street, built in 1836, was initially known as St. George Avenue, Mickiewicz Street (Polish: ulica Mickiewicza), when Vilnius was under Polish rule (1922–1939). At the beginning of the Soviet occupation in 1940 it was called Stalin Avenue, later renamed Lenin Avenue. The avenue carries its present name from 1939 to 1940 and since 1989. In the Soviet period the avenue was used for demonstrations and military parades in honor of International Workers' Day on 1 May and the October Revolution on 7 November.

A portion of the avenue from the Vilnius Cathedral to Vincas Kudirka Square was thoroughly reconstructed before the celebration of the 750th anniversary of Mindaugas' coronation in 2003. The reconstructions included building an underground parking facility – the first such in Lithuania - under the Municipality Square and renovation of all kinds of pipelines and communication cables under the street. Over 100 new trees were planted. During the excavations a few archaeological findings were found and are now on display in the parking garage. Other sections of the avenue were also reconstructed; this work was completed in 2009.

== Gallery ==
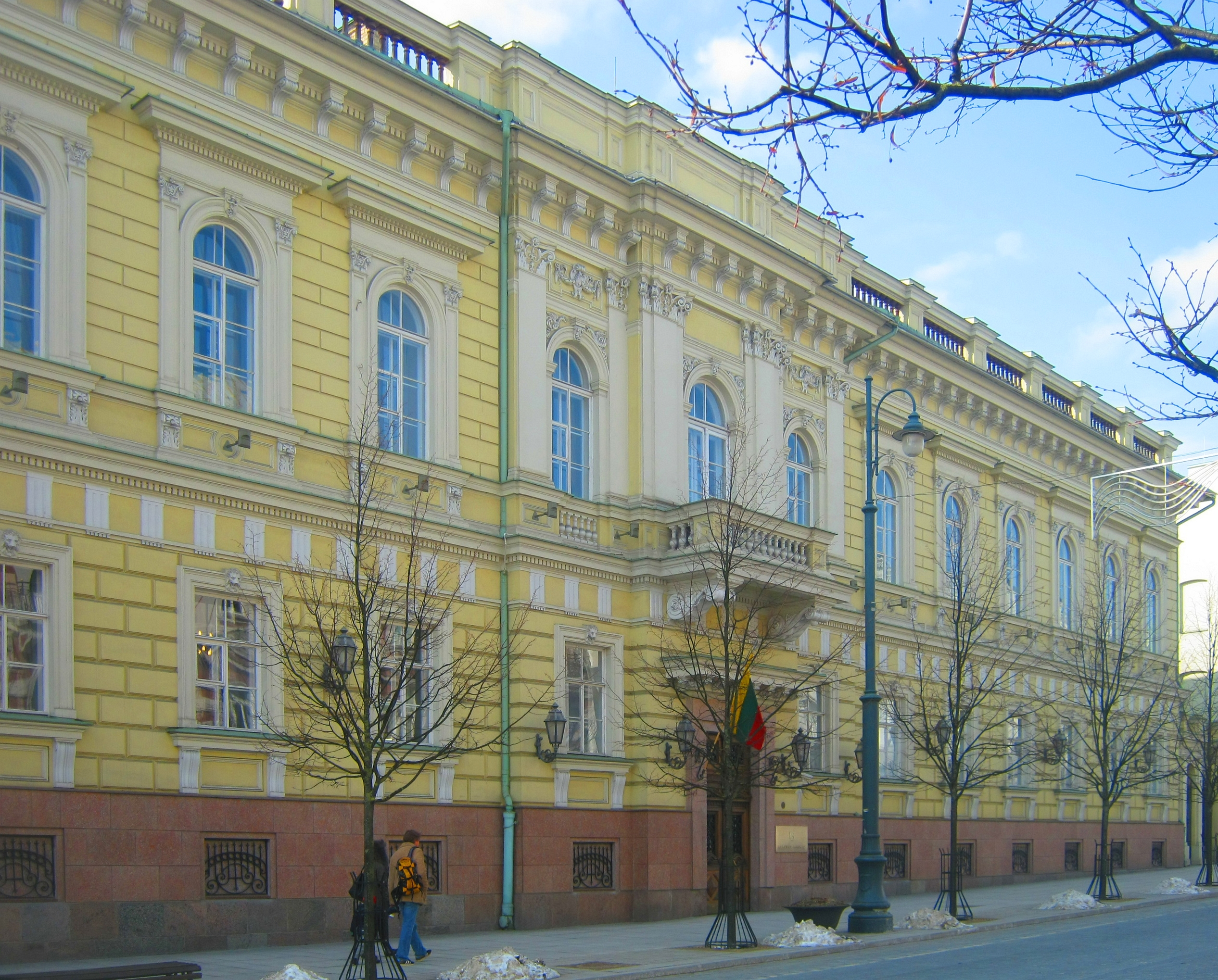
Bank of Lithuania

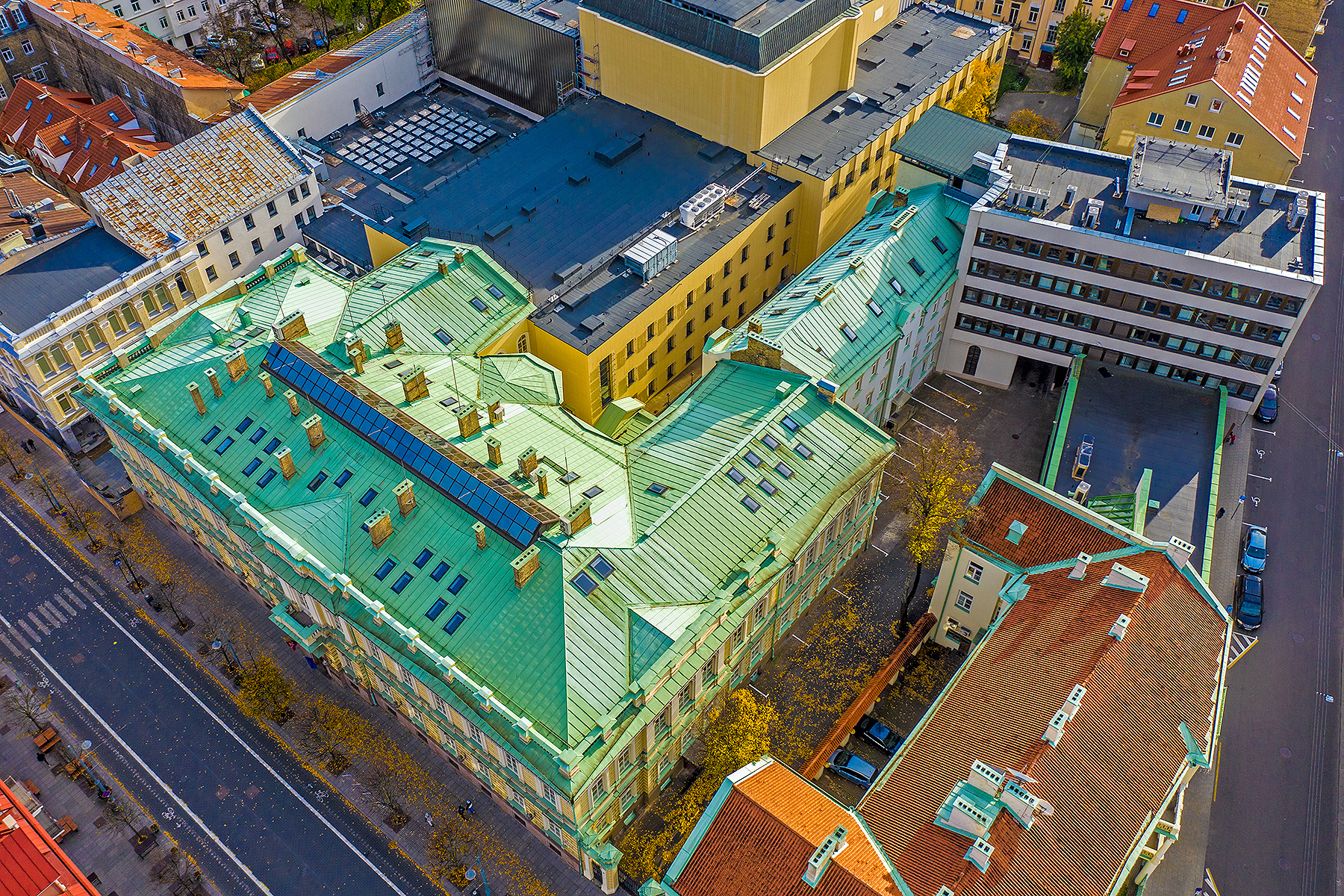
Bank of Lithuania

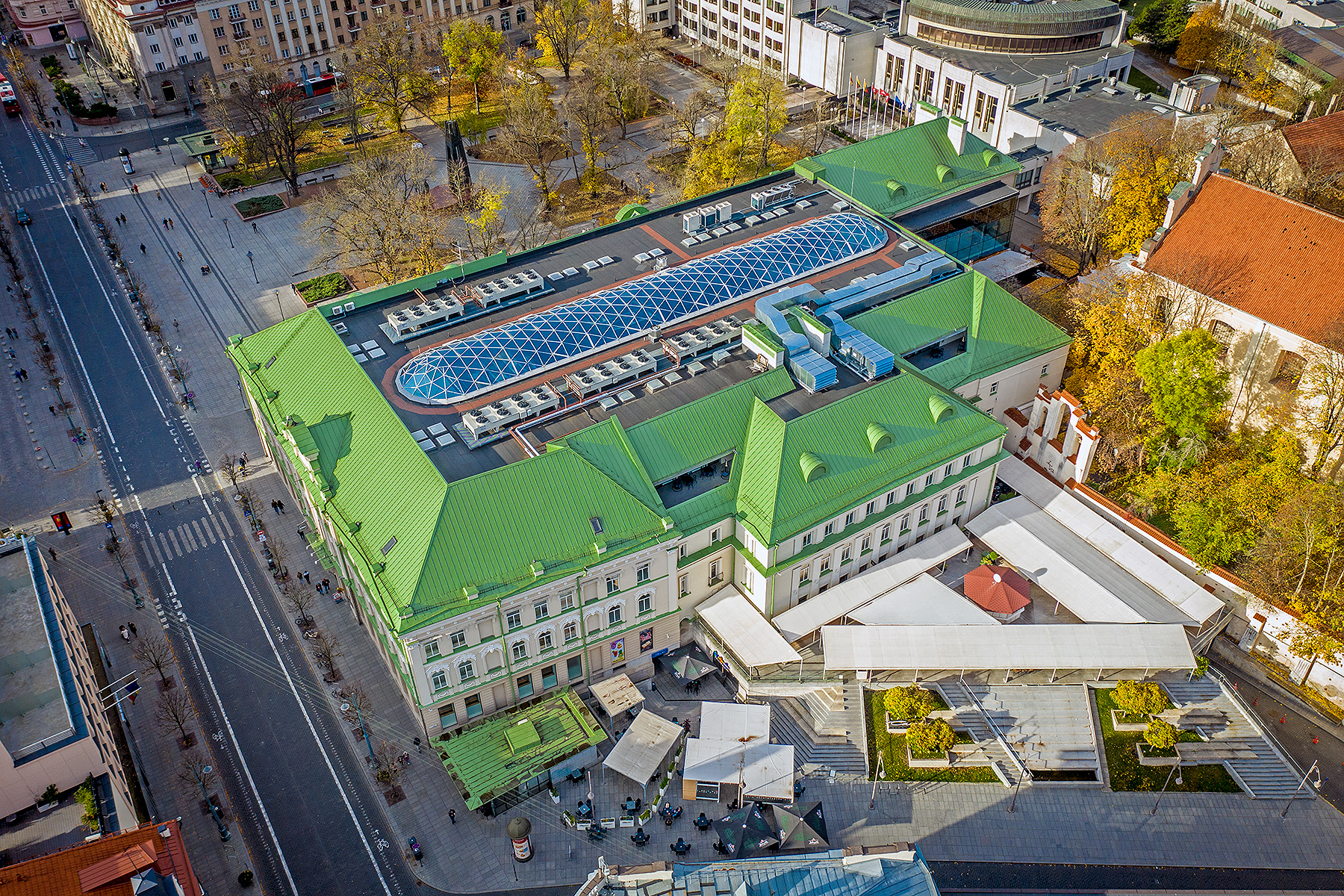
GO9 Mall

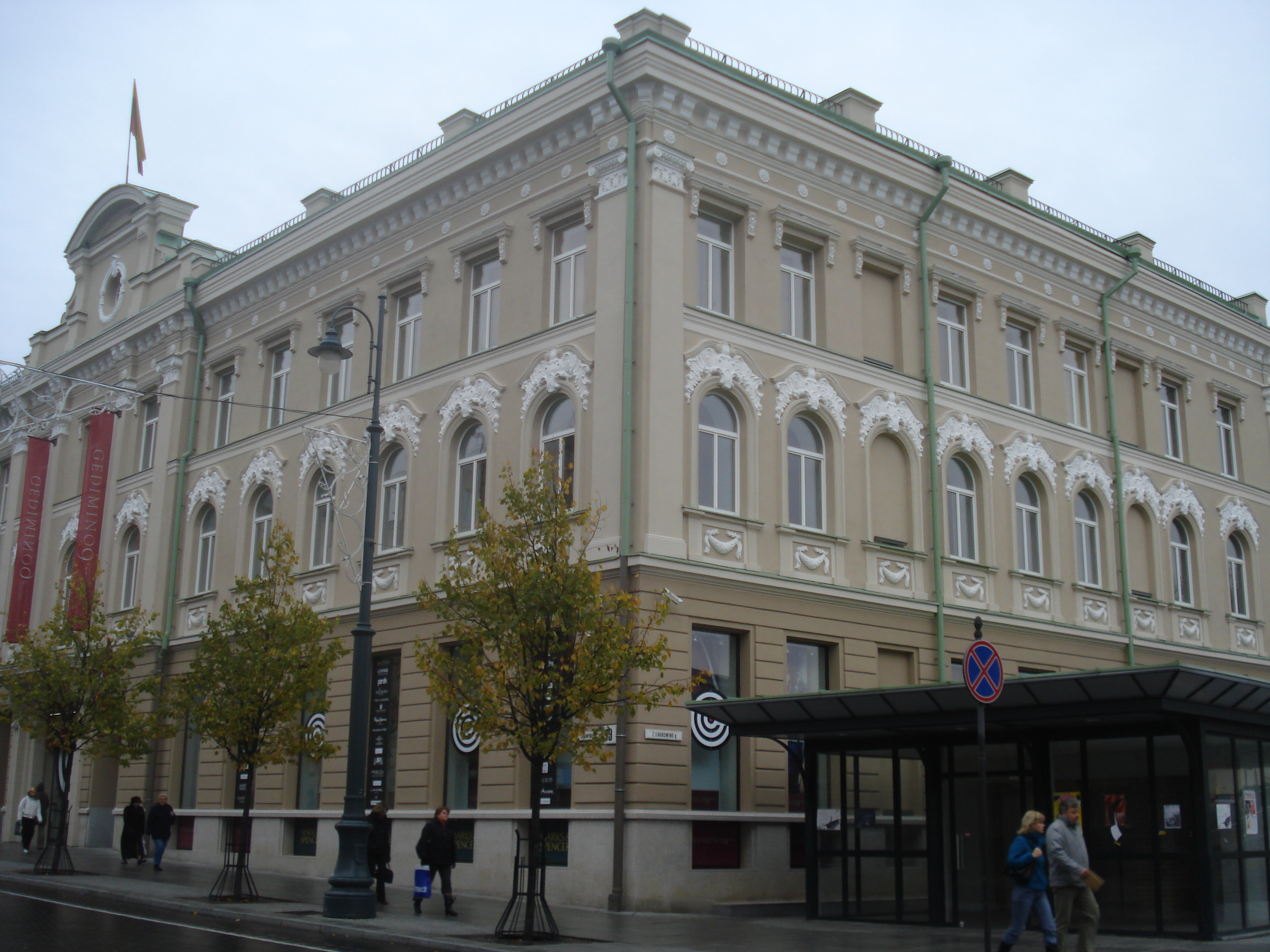
"Gedimino 9" Shopping Centre

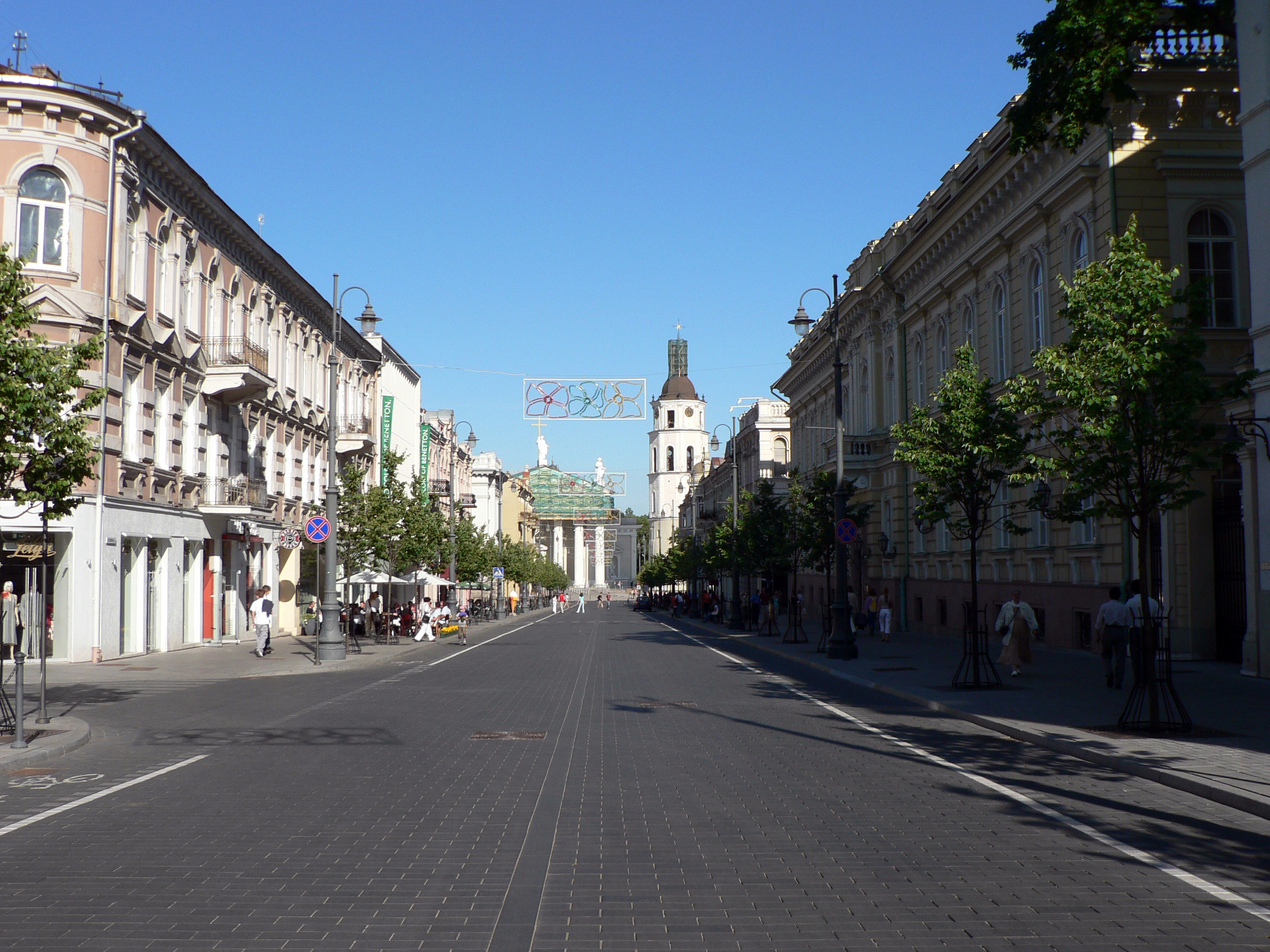
Gedimino Avenue

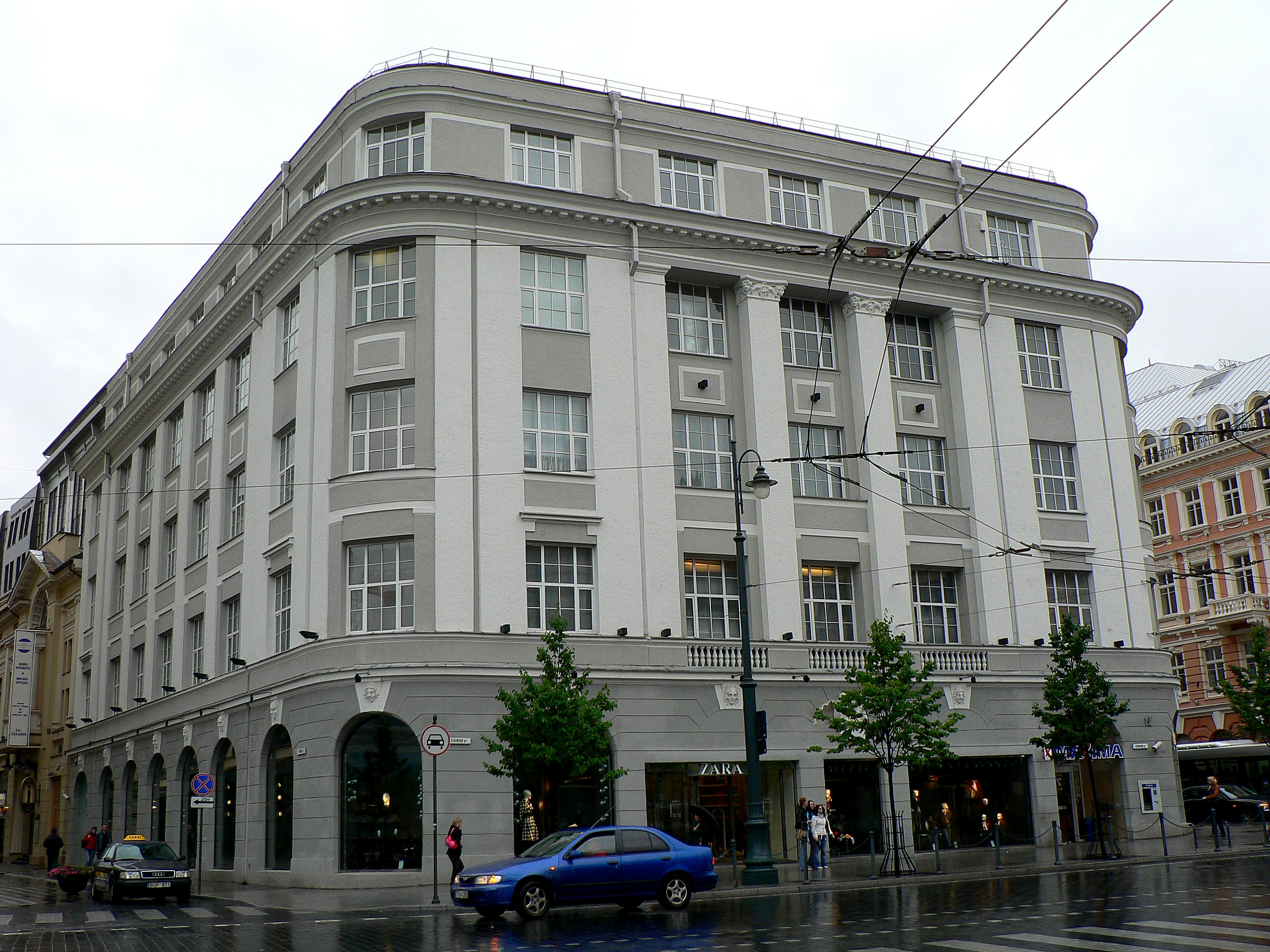
Jabłkowski Brothers

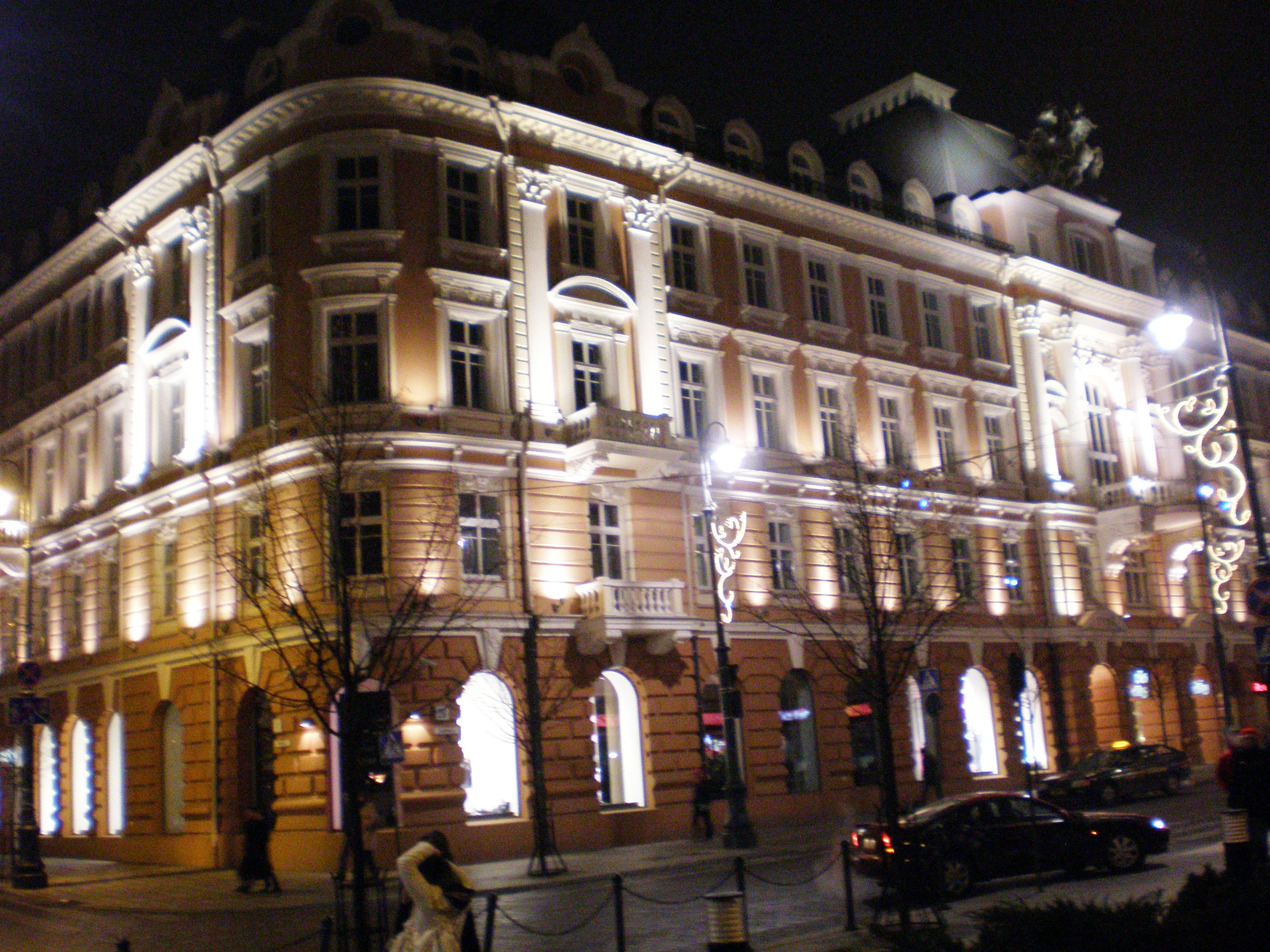
At night

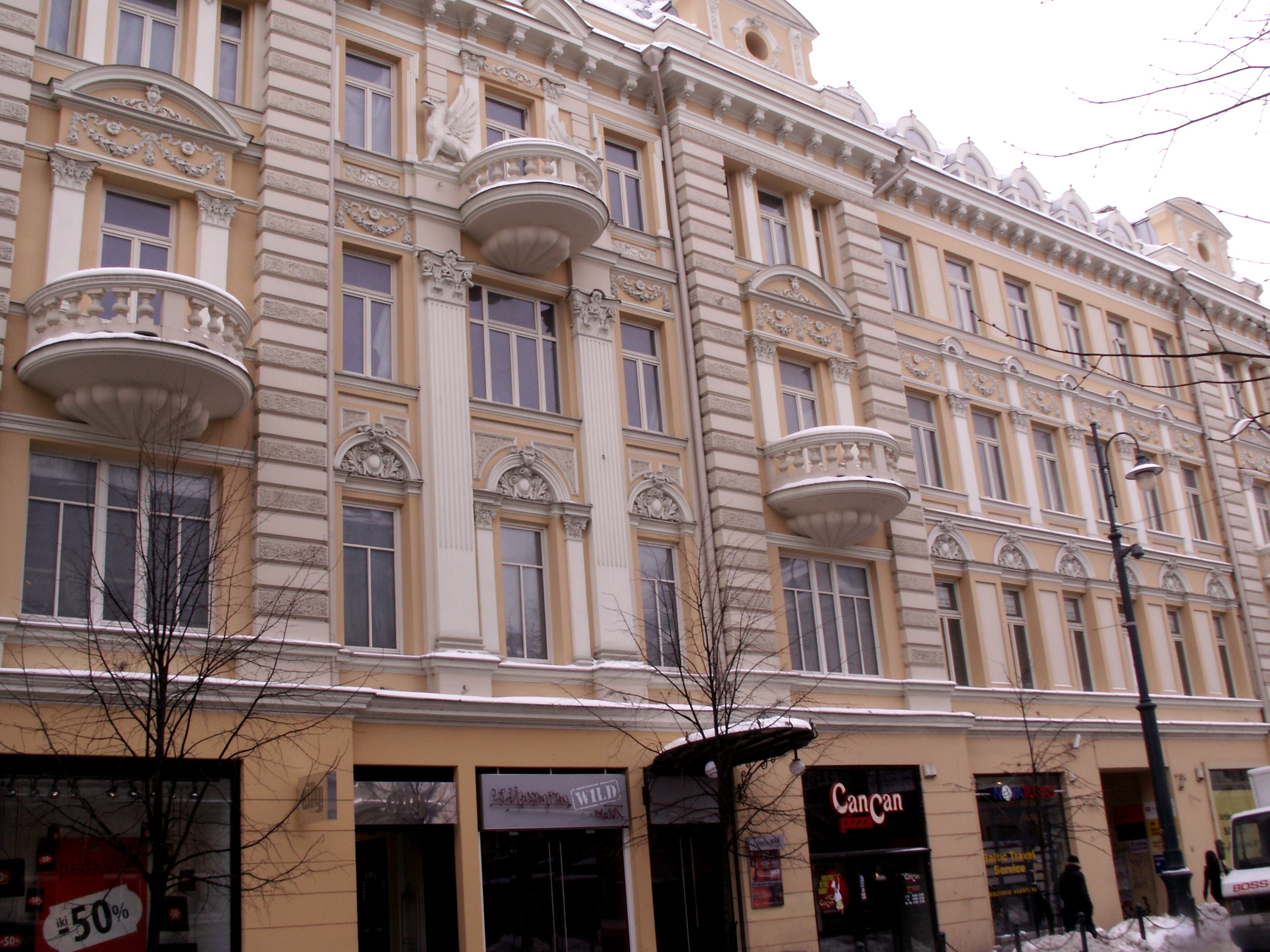
Gedimino 22

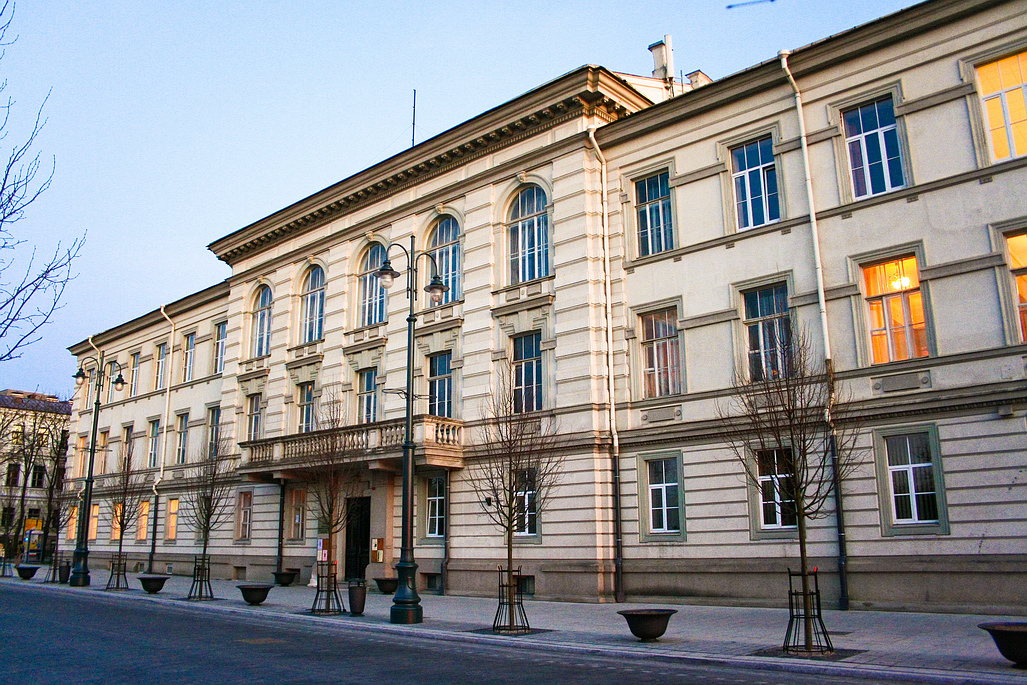
LMTA Palace

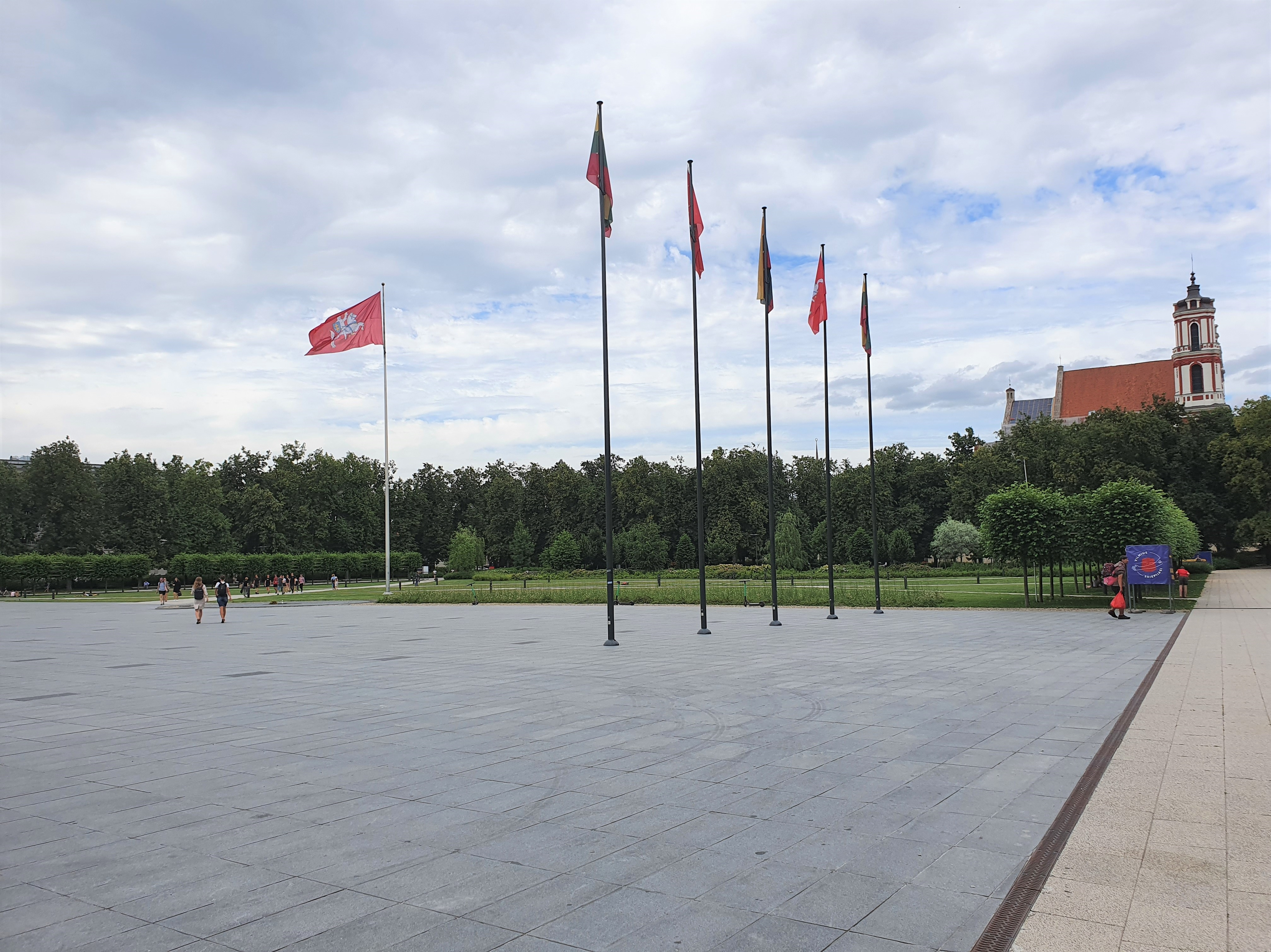
Lukiškės Square

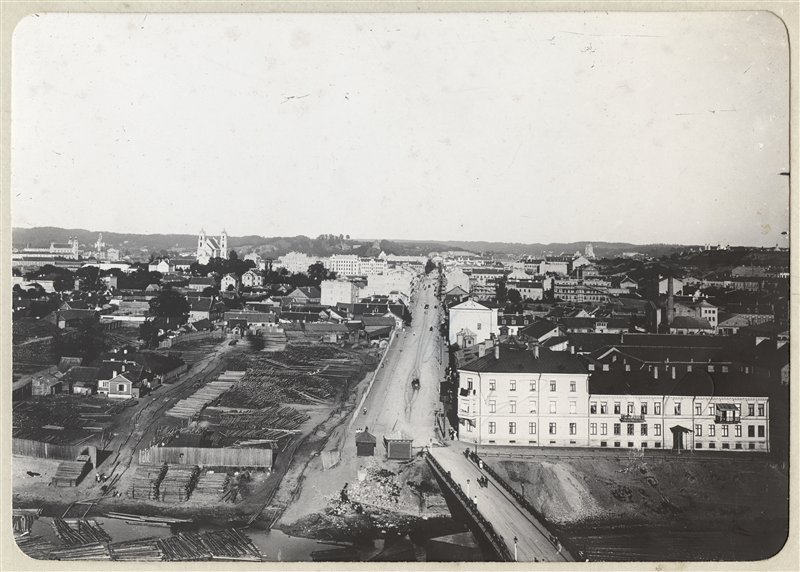
Saint George prospectus (1900)

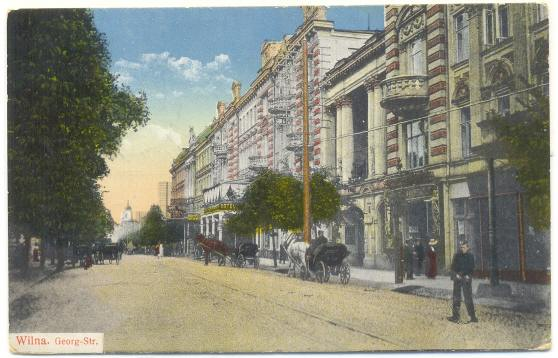
Prospectus (1912)

== See also ==
- Former Jabłkowski Brothers department store in Mickiewicz Street in Vilnius
