= Wanda Gentil-Tippenhauer =

Polish painter and skier (1899-1965)

Wanda Anna Gentil-Tippenhauer Widigierowa
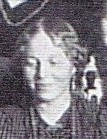
- Wanda Gentil-Tippenhauer, 1938
- Born: 13 January 1899; Port-au-Prince, Haiti
- Died: 12 August 1965 (aged 66); Zakopane, Poland
- Resting place: Zakopane
- Parents: Louis Wiepert Gentil-Tippenhaue (father); Antonina Wiktoria Rosicka (mother)

Wanda Anna Gentil-Tippenhauer Widigierowa, aka Ruda Wanda (1899-1965) was a Polish painter, a passionate skier and a Tatra Mountains devotee.

== Life ==
=== Early education in Haiti ===
Wanda Gentil-Tippenhauer was born in Port-au-Prince, Haiti, where her father Louis (1867-1959), a German scientist had been living since 1897. There he worked as the city's chief engineer: he was responsible in particular for the construction of the first narrow-gauge railway in the country. Wanda's mother was Antonina Wiktoria née Rosicka. In Haiti she worked as a teacher. She was the first Polish translator of Shakespeare.

Wanda spent her youth in the Caribbean island and left for Europe when she was a teenager.

=== Life in Europe, First World War ===
After graduating from high school (Ecole Vinet) in Lausanne, she began studies at the School of Fine Arts in Hamburg.

At the end of World War I, she moved to Warsaw where she obtained a Bachelor's Degree in Humanities.

In 1921, she graduated from the State Drawing Courses for Teachers at the Warsaw School of Fine Arts (Szkoła Sztuk Pięknych w Warszawie), then led by Karol Tichy. The artist came to Bygoszcz with her mother Wiktoria Gentil-Tippenhauer and her younger sister Jadwiga around 1921, living on Zamoyskiego Street. She quickly integrated the social life of the city on the Brda river.

The two following years (1921-1923), Wanda transferred back to Hamburg to study. In the years 1921–1923 she studied at the School of Fine Arts. She also travelled extensively around Europe (Italy, France, Switzerland and Germany) and to America.

On 13 June 1924, she married Wacław or Ludwik Widigier (1901-1939), an art collector in Warsaw. Tomasz Piskorski, a long-time friend of Wanda (who will be his daughter Katarzyna's godmother) was present at the ceremony.

She discovered Tatras and Zakopane in the mid-1920s, with which she remained connected all her life. There, she met Józef Oppenheim (1887-1946), a legendary man and one of the most important figures in Zakopane between the wars, who was a mountaineer, rescuer, skier and long-time head of the Tatra Volunteer Search and Rescue (Tatrzańskie Ochotnicze Pogotowie Ratunkowe TOPR). Gentil-Tippenhauer became an experienced skier, criss-crossing the entire surrounding mountains and participating as well to TOPR expeditions. Wanda was nicknamed Ruda because of the ginger color of her hair.

=== Painting exhibitions, World War II ===
From 1927 onwards, Wanda Gentil-Tippenhauer started exhibiting, mainly at the Warsaw Society for the Encouragement of Fine Arts. In 1932, she exhibited a series of Zakopane landscapes at the Jabłkowski Brothers' department store in Warsaw.

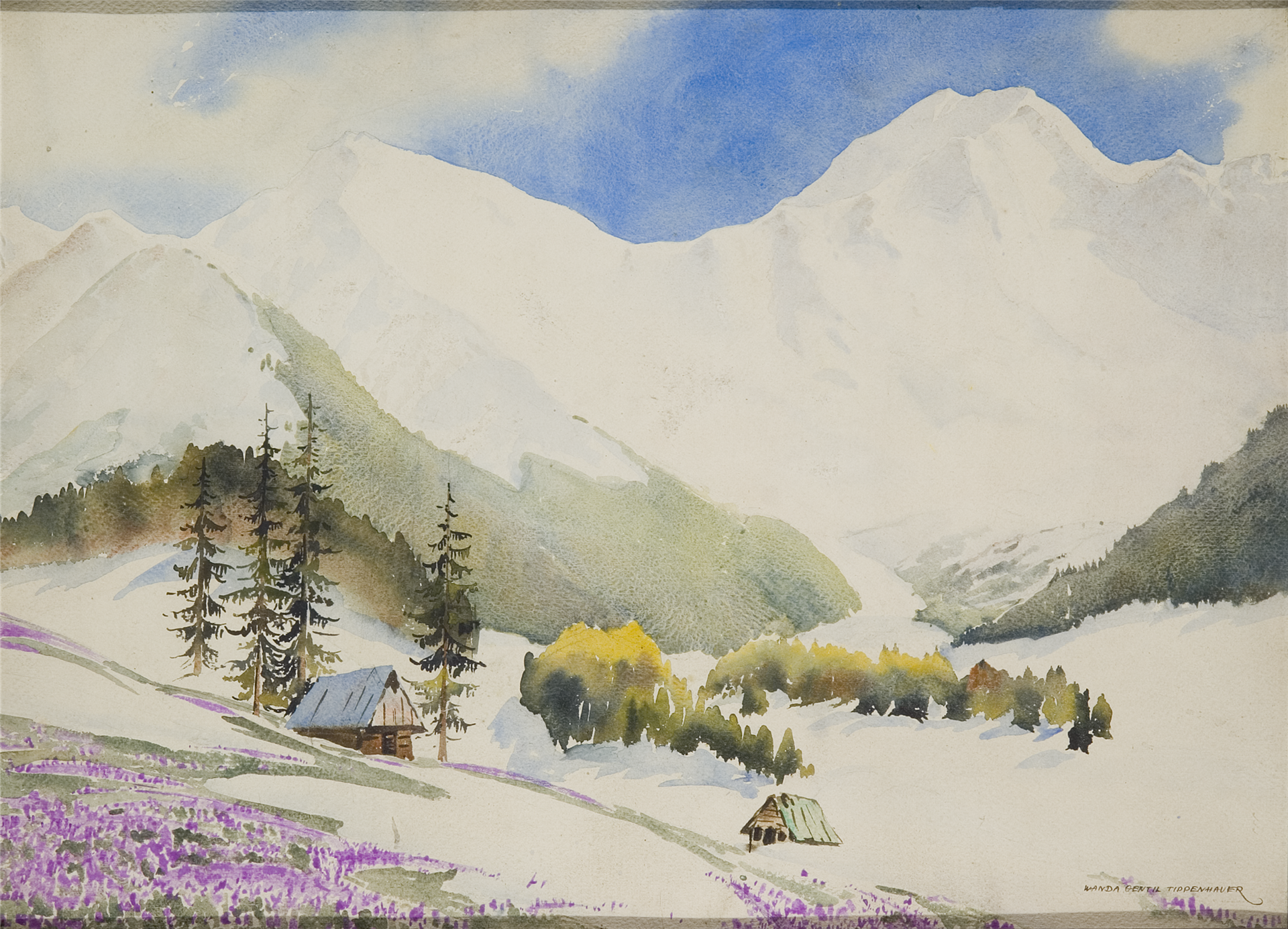
Wanda Gentil-Tippenhauer "Wiosna w Tatrach"

During these years, she also exhibited in Bydgoszcz (1927,1931,1938), Łódź (1932 to 1939), Zakopane and abroad: Lyon, Milan and Turin (1928). In addition, she realized artistic commissions in Poland (murals in Zgierz and Berezhany, today in Ukraine).

From 1940 to 1942, she stayed with Oppenheim in Manevychi, Ukraine, working as a visual artist in a wood products factory. Afterwards, Wanda moved to Warsaw, giving drawing lessons during clandestine classes (1943–1944). At that time, she hid Oppenheim, who was at risk of arrest and death due to his Jewish origins. After fleeing a ruined Watsaw, Wanda and Józef stayed in Pruszków; at the end of March 1945, they moved together with her Wiktoria to Zakopane mother.

During the Warsaw Uprising, most of her pre-war works were destroyed.

=== Post war activities ===
After the war, Wanda lived in Zakopane, except during the two years (1946–1947) following Józef Oppenheim's murder when she stayed in Warsaw.

After the conflict, Gentil-Tippenhauer took part in almost every exhibition of the Association of Polish Artists and Designers (Związek Polskich Artystów Plastyków, ZPAP) in Zakopane. She also had a solo exhibition in this town in 1961.

In 1965, a posthumous exhibition was organized at Warsaw's Central Bureau of Artistic Exhibitions (Centralne Biuro Wystaw Artystycznych).

=== Organizations member ===
Gentil-Tippenhauer was very active socially, participating to many organizations, among which:

- Polish Ski Association (Polski Związek Narciarski);
- Society for the Encouragement of Fine Arts (since 1935);
- Polish Art Society;
- Association of Polish Artists and Designers;
- Trade Union of Polish Visual Artists;
- Polish Decorative Art Association;
- Podhale Visual Artists Association in Zakopane.

== Painting activity ==
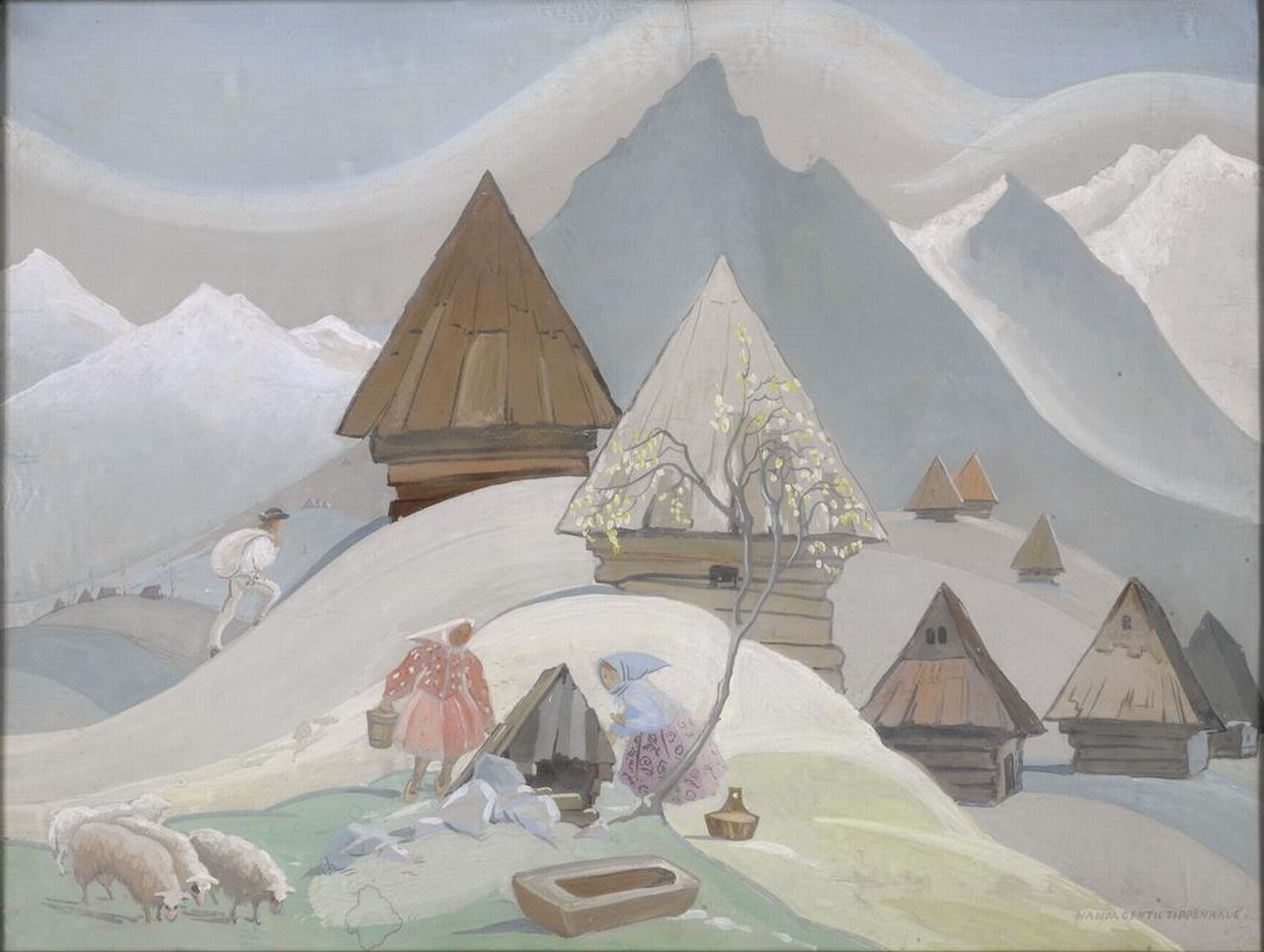
Wanda Gentil-Tippenhauer - "Szałasy"

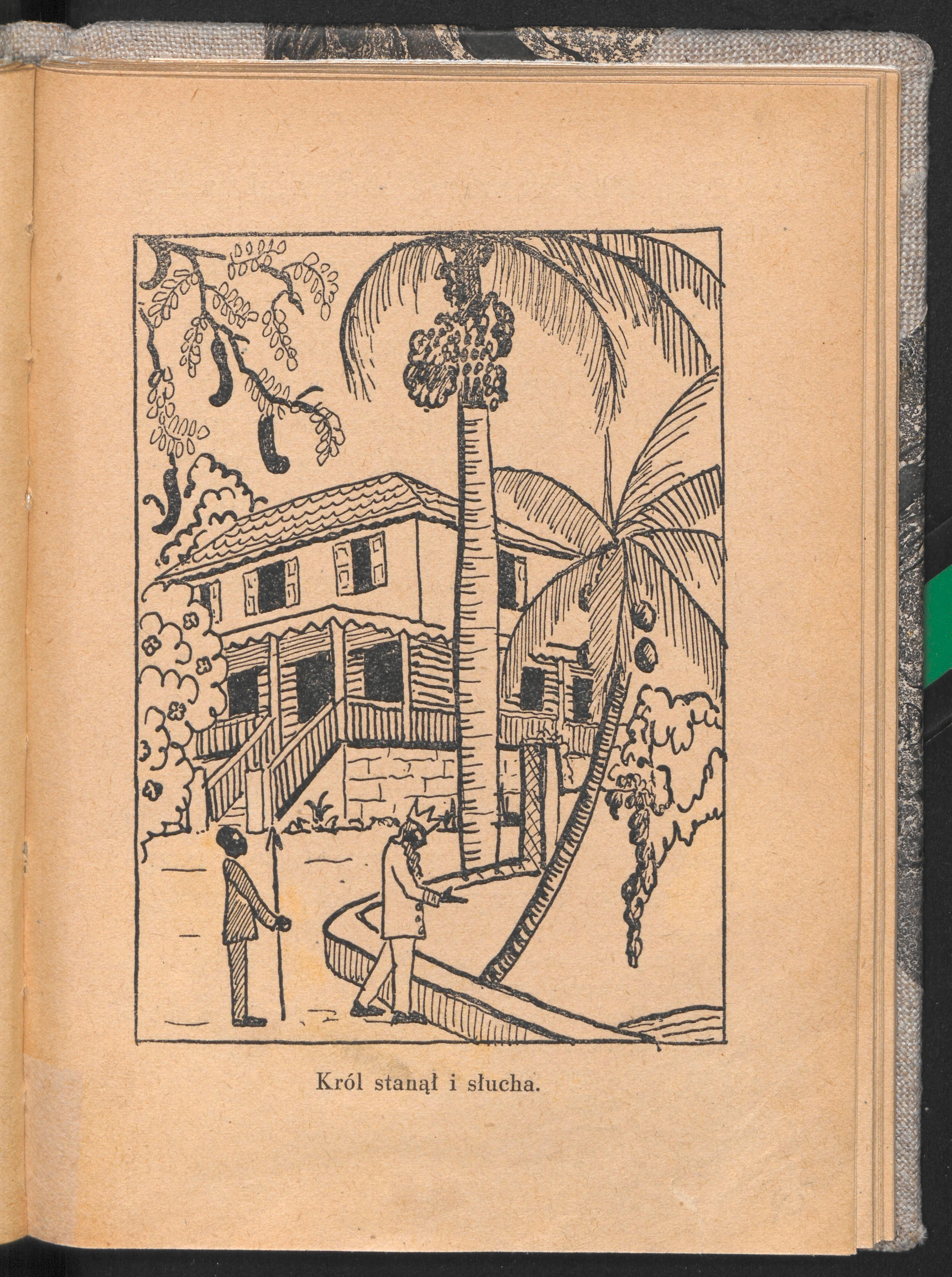
Bajki murzyńskie z Haiti - Illustration p45

Wanda Gentil-Tippenhauer realized watercolor and tempera motifs inspired by the landscapes of the Tatra Mountains (view of Giewont) and genre scenes from Podhale or Polish Highlands. Sometimes she painted flowers and religious scenes.

She also performed painting on glass, wall painting, batik, kilim designs and was involved in interior design and painting conservation.

In the interwar period, she created, among other things, wall paintings in the Church of St. Catherine of Alexandria in Zgierz and in the chapel of a castle near Berezhany, Ukraine.

Moreover, Wanda illustrated a book collecting fairy tales from Haiti, written by her mother Wiktoria Gentil-Tippenhauer (Bajki murzyńskie z Haiti), published in 1931.

In the Zakopane, she created decorations for the Orbis building and the Polish–Soviet Friendship Society (Towarzystwo Przyjaźni Polsko-Radzieckiej) seat hall.

Gentil-Tippenhauer has also created 11 ski routes in the Tatras, as described by Józef Oppenheim in his book Szlaki narciarskie Tatr Polskich i główne przejścia na południową stronę (Skiing routes of the Polish Tatras and main passages to the southern side).

=== Awards and collections ===
In 1927, at her debuts, she received a distinction from the Warsaw Society for the Encouragement of Fine Arts for her batik Green shawl.

Many of her works are now in Zakopane (Muzeum Tatrzańskie), others can be found in Łodż (Muzeum Sztuki w Łodzi) and in Bydgoszcz (Regional Museum). Most of her artwork is in private collections in Zakopane.

== Writing works ==
Wanda Tippenhauer's writing dealt mostly with art criticism. In 1925, she started penning reviews in Kurier Łódzki and in 1926–1929 in the Vilnius Przegląd Artystyczny (Artistic review).

She was interested in Podhale folk art, organizing competitions and exhibitions in Zakopane, writing books about folk artists, such as Andrzej Strug and Władysław Matlakowski, issued by Wierchy publishing house (1938–1961) and Polska Sztuka Ludowa publishing house (1954–1957).

Together with Józef Oppenheim, she wrote a memoir, Pamięci zmarłych schronisk (In Memory of the Deceased Shelters) published in 1948 after Oppenheim' death. With writer Stanisław Zieliński, she penned W stronę Pysznej (Towards Pyszna) in 1961, a book of tourist and skiing memories mainly related to Oppenheim.

Wanda Gentil-Tippenhauer's typescript SOS w Tatrach was never published. A copy is held in the archives of The Tatra Museum in Zakopane; it is dedicated to Oppenheim and the expeditions of the TOPR between 1914 and 1939. It relates, among other things, the April 1933 TOPR mission to recover the body of the mountaineer Wincenty Birkenmajer. The museum collections also include Wanda's letters to Oppenheim.

== Family ==
Wanda Gentil was Oppenheim's life companion. In 1945, she moved and lived with him in the Krzeptówki district of Zakopane. On February 28, 1946, she was present when Józef was murdered, she was shot as well in the head.

After her death on 12 August 1965, she was buried at the Pęksowy Brzyzek National Cemetery in Zakopane.

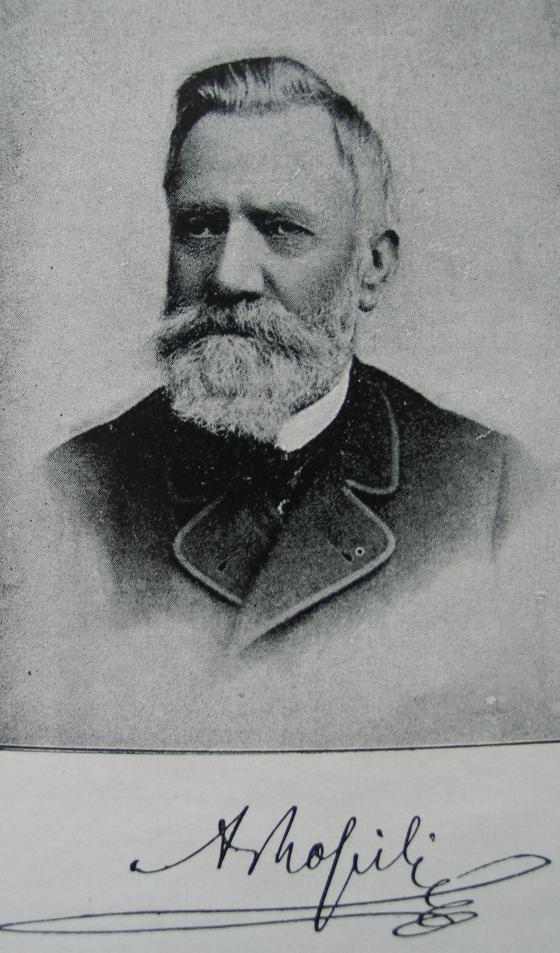
Andrzej Rosicki (1814-1904)

A monument was erected on her grave, realized by students working under the supervision of sculptor Antoni Rząsa in Władysław Hasior's studio of the Art Schools in Zakopane (Zespół Szkół Plastycznych im. Antoniego Kenara w Zakopanem).

=== Grandfather ===
Andrzej Rosicki (1814-1904) was Wanda's grandfather on her mother's side. He became the mayor of Sochaczew before moving in 1862 to Łódź. He was elected on 16 December 1862, the successor of Franciszek Traeger as the mayor of Łódź. He was however removed from this position on 15 February 1865 for having provided assistance to the participants of the January Uprising. He was a co-founder of the Municipal Credit Society in Łódź (Towarzystwo Kredytowe Miejskie w Łodzi) for which he served as a director from October 1872 until the end of his life.

=== Mother ===
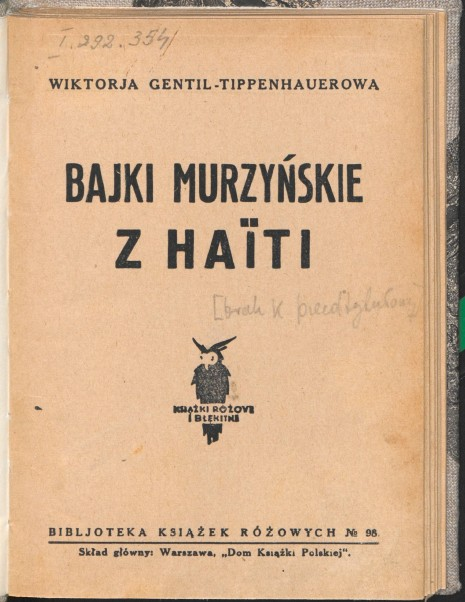
Black Fairy Tales from Haiti-Cover page

Wanda's mother was Antonina Wiktoria Rosicka (1863-1939 or 1946). Wiktoria was born in Łódź, the daughter of Andrzej Rosicki, once a city's mayor (1863-1865) and founder-director of a bank in Łódź. The girl studied in Zurich: it is where she met Louis Gentil-Tippenhauer, from a Marburg industrialist family. They married in 1897 and left to Haiti.

After separating from her husband, Antonina Wiktoria returned to Poland with her two daughters in 1921. They settled in Bydgoszcz for 18 years, at 15 Zamoyskiego Street where she was administrator of the tenement. At that time, she was also involved in charity work, as a member of the St. Vincent de Paul Conference at the Missionary Church in Bydgoszcz. Right after the end of World War II, she lived with her daughter Wanda in Zakopane (from mid-1945 to January 1946). She probably moved to Paris where her younger daughter Jadwiga was staying. Wiktoria probably died in the capital of France or in Warsaw where Wanda lived till 1946. Her exact place of death is not known.

Antonina Wiktoria Gentil-Tippenhauer was the only Polish translator of William Shakespeare's work in the 19th century: at the turn of the 19th and 20th centuries, a female translator was a rarity. In 1891, she translated Romeo and Juliet. In 1928, she also translated Charles Dickens’ novel The Life and Adventures of Martin Chuzzlewit to Polish.

In addition she wrote collections of short stories for children Wolę być sobie niż królem (I'd Rather Be Myself Than the King) (1929) and Bajki murzyńskie z Haiti (Black Fairy Tales from Haiti) (1931).

=== God-daughter ===
Wanda Gentil-Tippenhauer was the godmother of Katarzyna Piskorska (1937-2010), a Polish sculptor and medalist. Pikorska died in the 2010 Smolensk air disaster.

== See also ==
- Józef Oppenheim
- Society for the Encouragement of Fine Arts in Warsaw
- Association of Polish Artists and Designers
- Podhale
- Batik
- Tatra Volunteer Search and Rescue

== Bibliography ==
- Radwańska-Paryska, Zofia; Paryski, Witold Henryk (2004). Wielka encyklopedia tatrzańska [The Great Tatra Encyclopedia] (in Polish). Poronin: Wydawnictwo Górskie. ISBN 83-7104-008-3.
- Jan, Kiełkowski (2013). Gentil-Tippenhauer Wanda. W: Wielka encyklopedia gór i alpinizmu. T. 6: Ludzie gór [Gentil-Tippenhauer Wanda. In: The Great Encyclopedia of Mountains and Alpinism. Vol. 6: People of the Mountains.] (in Polish). Katowice: Wydawnictwo Stapis. p. 270. ISBN 978-83-61050-89-6.
- Nadolska, Anna (26 January 2022). Malarka (nie)zwykła. Wanda Gentil-Tippenhauer i jej związki z międzywojenną Bydgoszczą. Acta Universitatis Nicolai Copernici Zabytkoznawstwo i Konserwatorstwo. T52 [An (un)ordinary painter. Wanda Gentil-Tippenhauer and her connections with interwar Bydgoszcz. Acta Universitatis Nicolai Copernici Monument Studies and Conservation. T52] (in Polish). Toruń: Uniwersytet Mikołaja Kopernika w Toruniu. pp. 53–82. doi:10.12775/AUNC_ZiK.2021.003.
- Nadolska, Anna (2022). Z tropikalnej wyspy Haiti do Bydgoszczy. Wiktoria Gentil-Tippenhauer (1863-1946?). Kronika Bydgoska T43 [From the tropical island of Haiti to Bydgoszcz. Wiktoria Gentil-Tippenhauer (1863-1946?). Bydgoszcz Chronicles T43] (in Polish). Bydgoszcz: Towarzystwo Miłosnikow Miasta Bydgoszczy - Bydgoskie Towarzystwo Naukowe. pp. 377–384.
