= Soviet-occupied Lithuania =

Soviet-occupied Lithuania may refer to:

- Lithuanian Soviet Socialist Republic
- Soviet occupation of the Baltic states (1940), including Lithuania
- Soviet re-occupation of the Baltic states (1944), including Lithuania

== See also ==
- Baltic states under Soviet rule (1944–1991)
- German occupation of the Baltic states during World War II
- German occupation of Lithuania during World War II
- Museum of Occupations and Freedom Fights
- Occupation of Lithuania by Nazi Germany
- Occupation of the Baltic states
