= Lukiškės =

Lukiškės (also spelled Łukiszki, Lukiski, Lukishki) can refer to several things:

- Lukiškės, Vilnius, a historic neighborhood of Vilnius known for its Tatar community
- Lukiškės Square, a large square in Vilnius known formerly as Lenin Square
- Lukiškės Prison, a prison in Vilnius established in 1904
