= Lukiškės Square =

Public square in Vilnius, Lithuania

Coordinates: 54°41′21″N 25°16′15″E

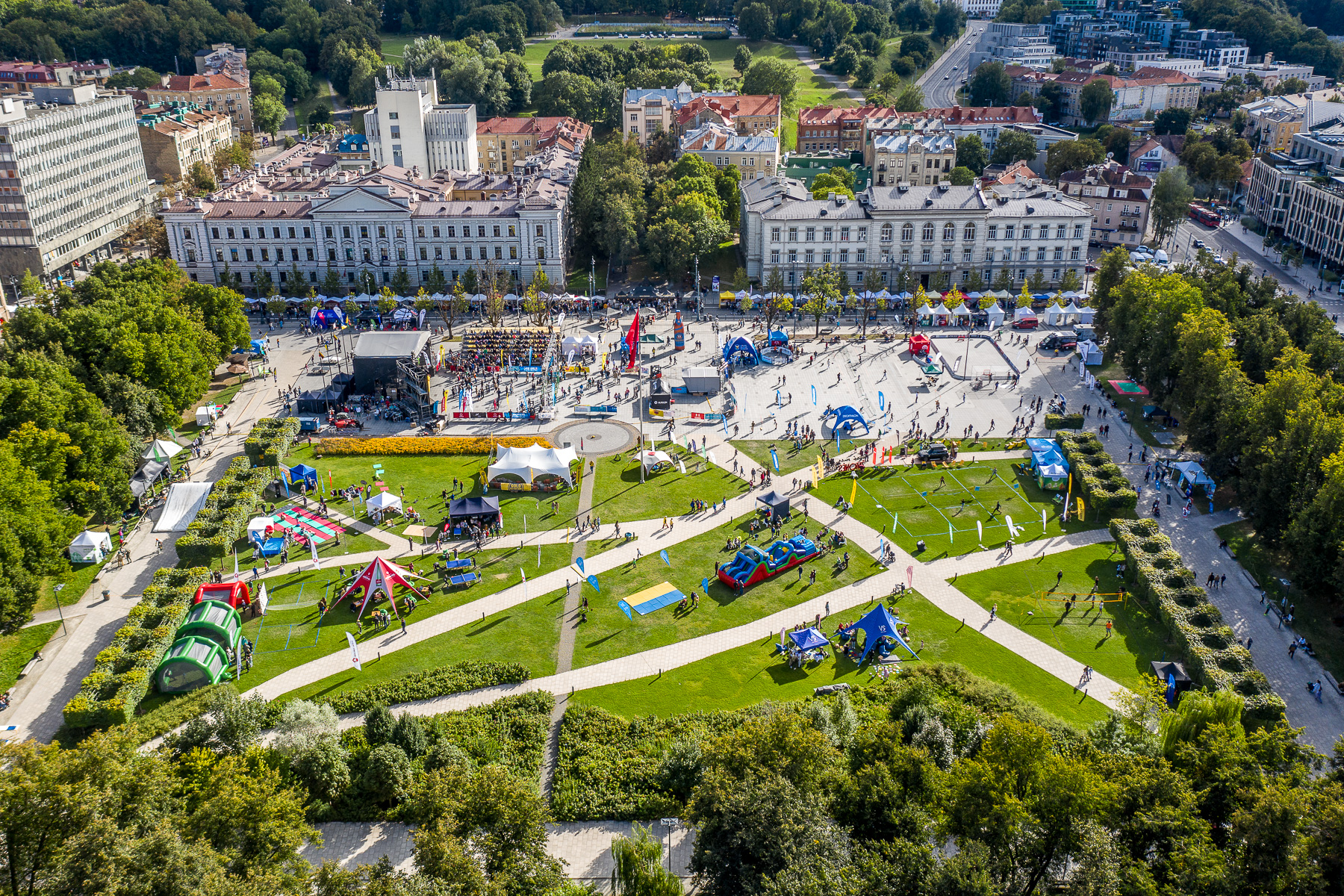
Lukiškės Square in 2022

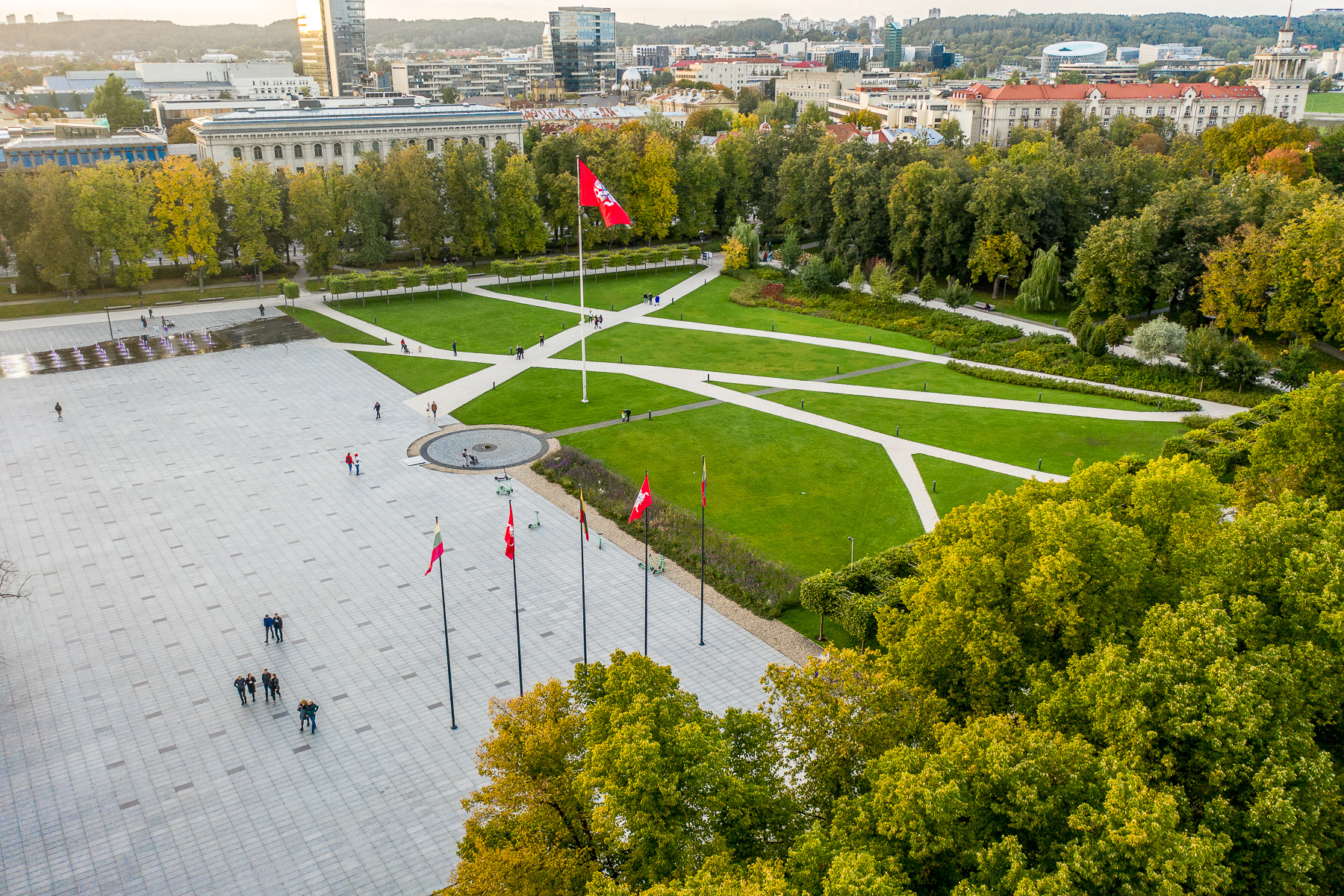
Lukiškės Square in 2021

Lukiškės Square (Lithuanian: Lukiškių aikštė; other spellings include Łukiszki, Lukiski, Lukishki) is the largest square (about 4 hectares (9.9 acres) in Vilnius, Lithuania, located in the center of the city. A major street in Vilnius, Gediminas Avenue, passes by the southern border of the square. It is surrounded by many public buildings, including the Ministry of Finance, Ministry of Foreign Affairs, Court of Appeal, Academy of Music and Theatre, Church of Saints Philip and James, and the Dominican monastery with the former St. Jacob Hospital.

== History ==
Between the 17th and 19th centuries, it was a suburb of Vilnius and called Lukiškės. The wooden Lukiškės mosque of the Lithuanian Tatars and their graveyard were prominent features of the suburb. These landmarks were destroyed by the Soviet authorities in the 1960s.

In 1852, Lukishki (Лукишки, as it was known in the Russian Empire) was designated to be reconstructed, and this was carried out in the 1860s, with St. George's Avenue (now Gediminas Avenue) crossing it from east to west. After the January Uprising in 1863, Lukiškės Square was one of the areas where public executions of insurgents took place. A particularly famous insurrectionist Konstanty Kalinowski was executed by hanging there on March 24, 1864. Mikhail Nikolayevich Muravyov, the Governor General of the Vilna Governorate, earned the nickname "The Hangman" from the frequent executions in the square. At the beginning of the 20th century the square was known for the traditional Kaziukas Fair.

The square became a symbol of terror when hundreds of opponents of the Soviet Union were interrogated, tortured and executed between 1944 and 1947 and on, in the infamous NKVD Palace facing the square. Among the victims killed there was the chief commander of the Union of Lithuanian Freedom Fighters, Adolfas Ramanauskas "Vanagas". Today the palace houses Vilnius County Court and the Court of Appeal of Lithuania, as well as the Museum of Genocide Victims in the former prison cells, occupying the basement and underground levels of the palace.

The square was reconstructed according to the design of V. Mikučianis in 1949–1952. During the Soviet occupation, the square was renamed to Lenin Square and a statue of Lenin was built in the middle of it in 1953. The statue, which used to be the largest of its kind in the country, was removed in 1991, after the restoration of independence of Lithuania. The gathered crowd celebrated the fall of the statue; its upper part was lifted using a crane, and broke off at the lower legs attached to the pedestal. The reassembled Lenin statue is now on display in Grūtas Park. The square was partially reconstructed in the 1990s.

== Gallery ==
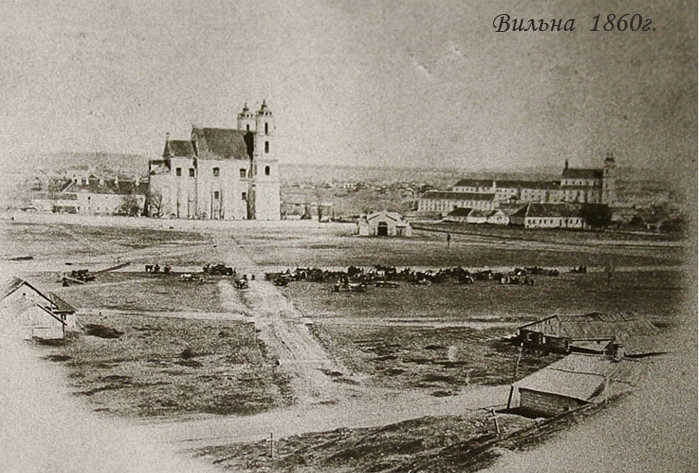
Lukiškės suburb in 1860

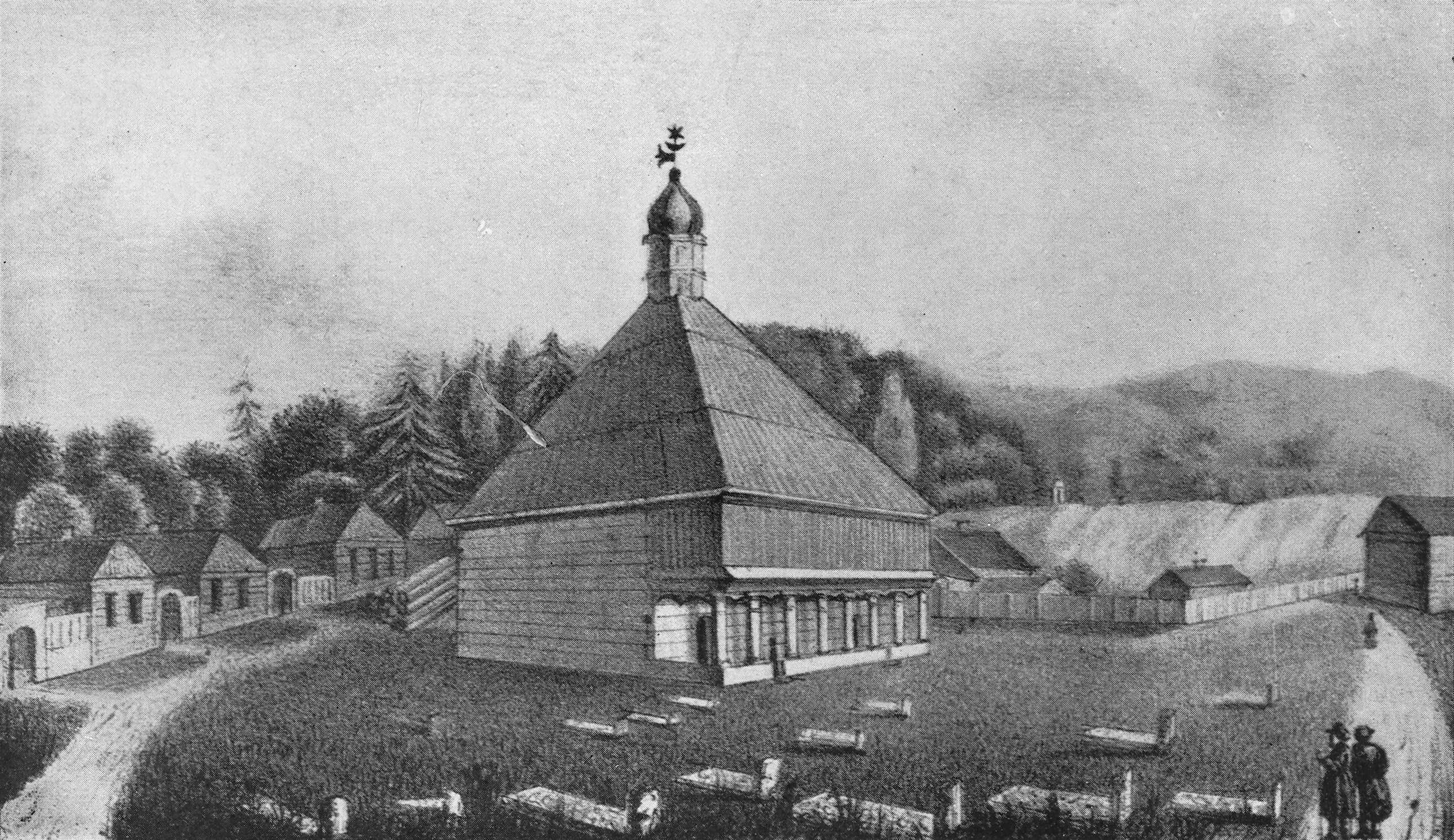
Tatar mosque and graveyard in the Lukiškės suburb (1830). Later it was replaced by another, a more traditional one in 1867.

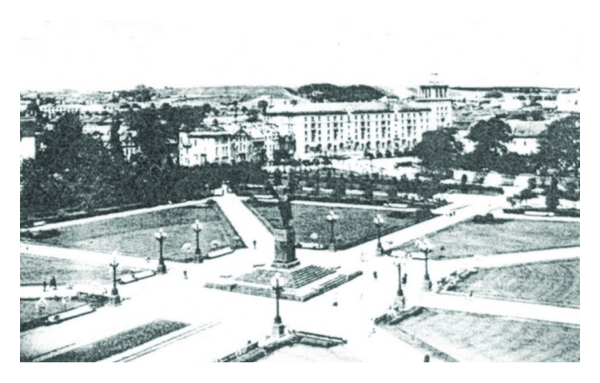
Lenin Square in 1948

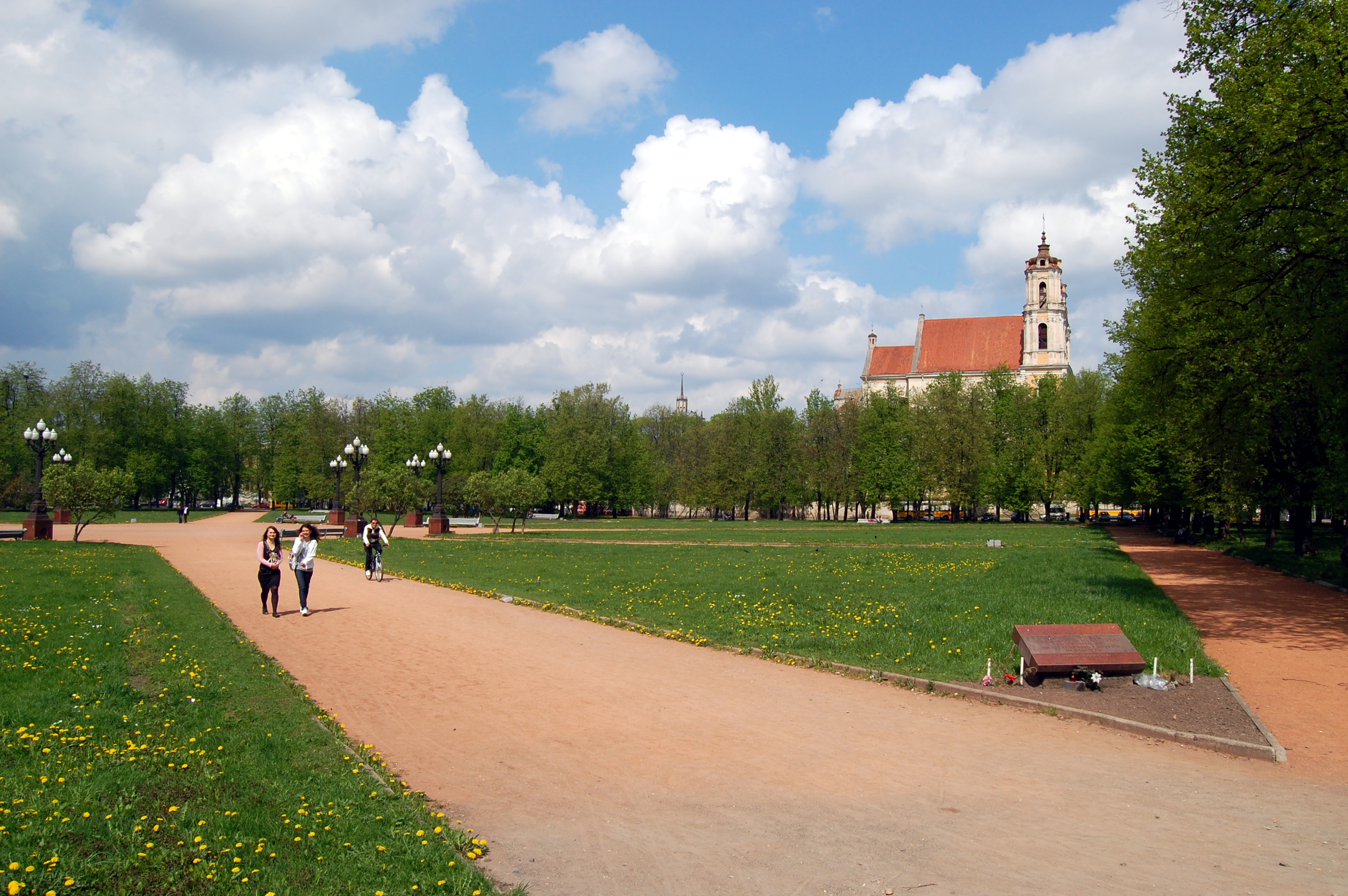
Square as seen from Gediminas Avenue, before reconstruction (2008)
