= Jabłkowski Brothers =

Polish trading company

Coordinates: 52.2322°N 21.0153°E

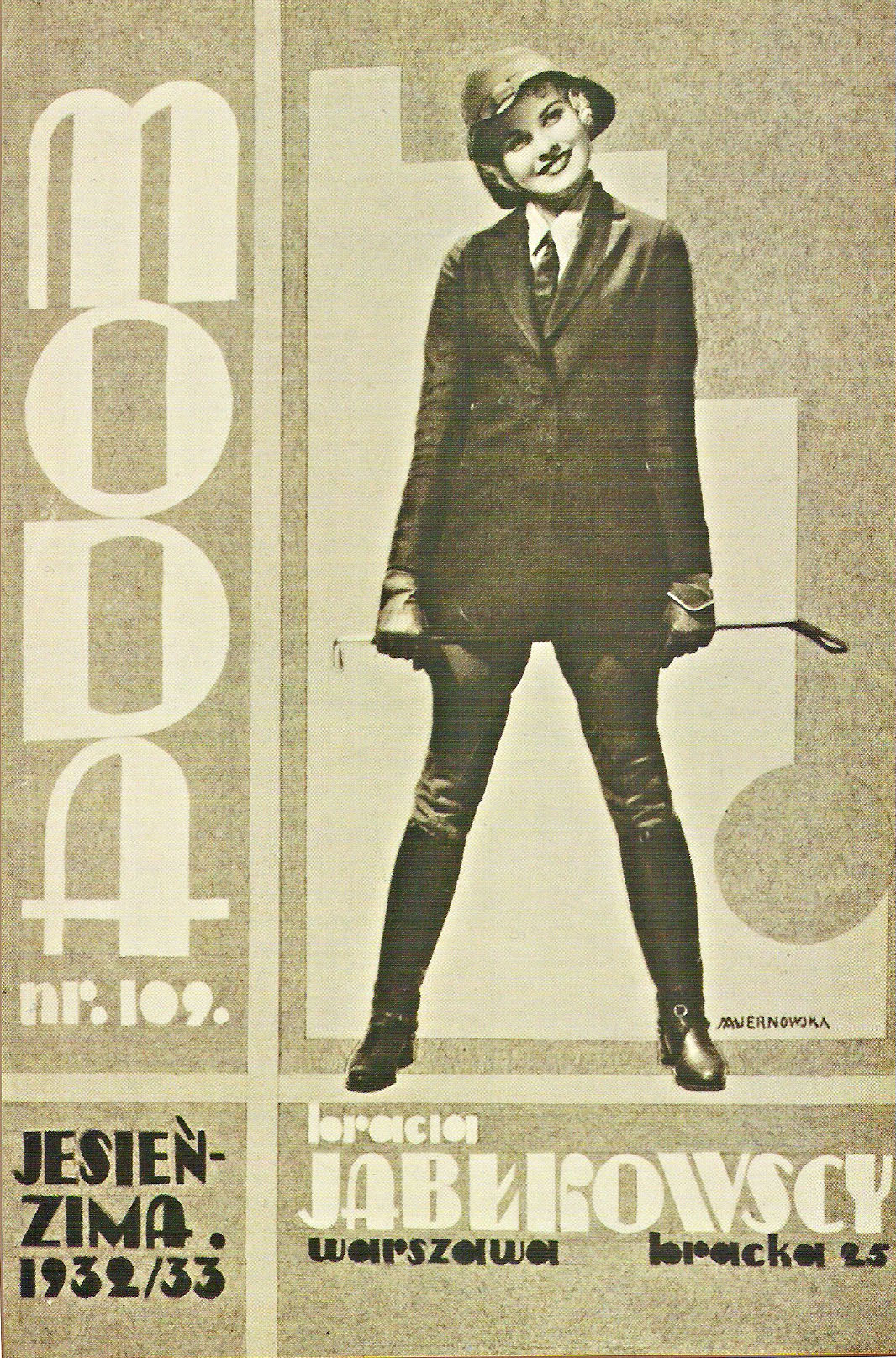
A cover of Moda fashion magazine featuring Jabłkowski Brothers' winter collection 1932/1933

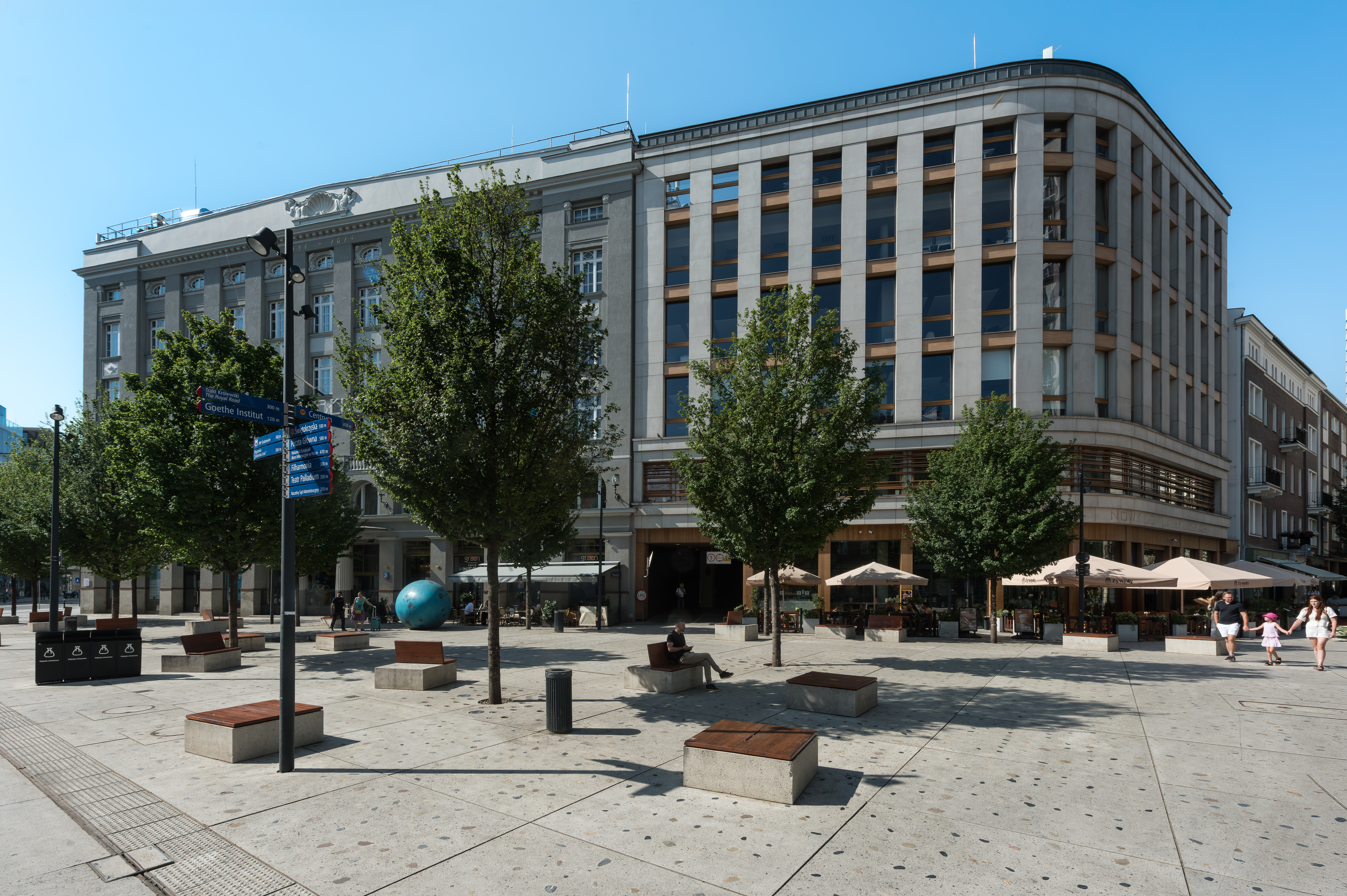
The central store in Warsaw. The original building to the left and a modern extension in the centre.

Jabłkowski Brothers (Polish: Bracia Jabłkowscy) is a Polish trading company, known for its group of high-end department stores in pre-war Poland. The Warsaw store was the very first department store in Poland. The store in Vilnius remained as the city's largest shopping center for over half a century from its opening up to 1974.

== History ==
Founded in 1884 in Warsaw by Aniela Jabłkowska, from 1892 it was a Jabłkowski family business. Initially run by Aniela, the company specialized in the trade of various goods, mostly clothes. In 1897, it was taken over by Aniela's brother Józef Jabłkowski. It was Józef who expanded the business significantly, moving it to a larger building in 1900 and in 1913 the Towarzystwo Akcyjne Bracia Jabłkowscy company entered the stock exchange. The company dealt with garments, underwear, textiles, silk, bedding, china, perfumes, as well as shoes, furs and articles for daily use.

Initially owning a group of smaller shops all around Congress Poland, in 1914 the company built the first of its large department stores in downtown Warsaw, at Bracka Street. In 1919, after World War I, the company opened another store in Mickiewicz Street, the main avenue of Wilno (now Vilnius, Lithuania). Both stores were considered to be among the most luxurious and reputable in Poland, much like their foreign counterparts, Galeries Lafayette, Harrods or Selfridges and were tourist attractions of their cities.

=== Bracka street store ===
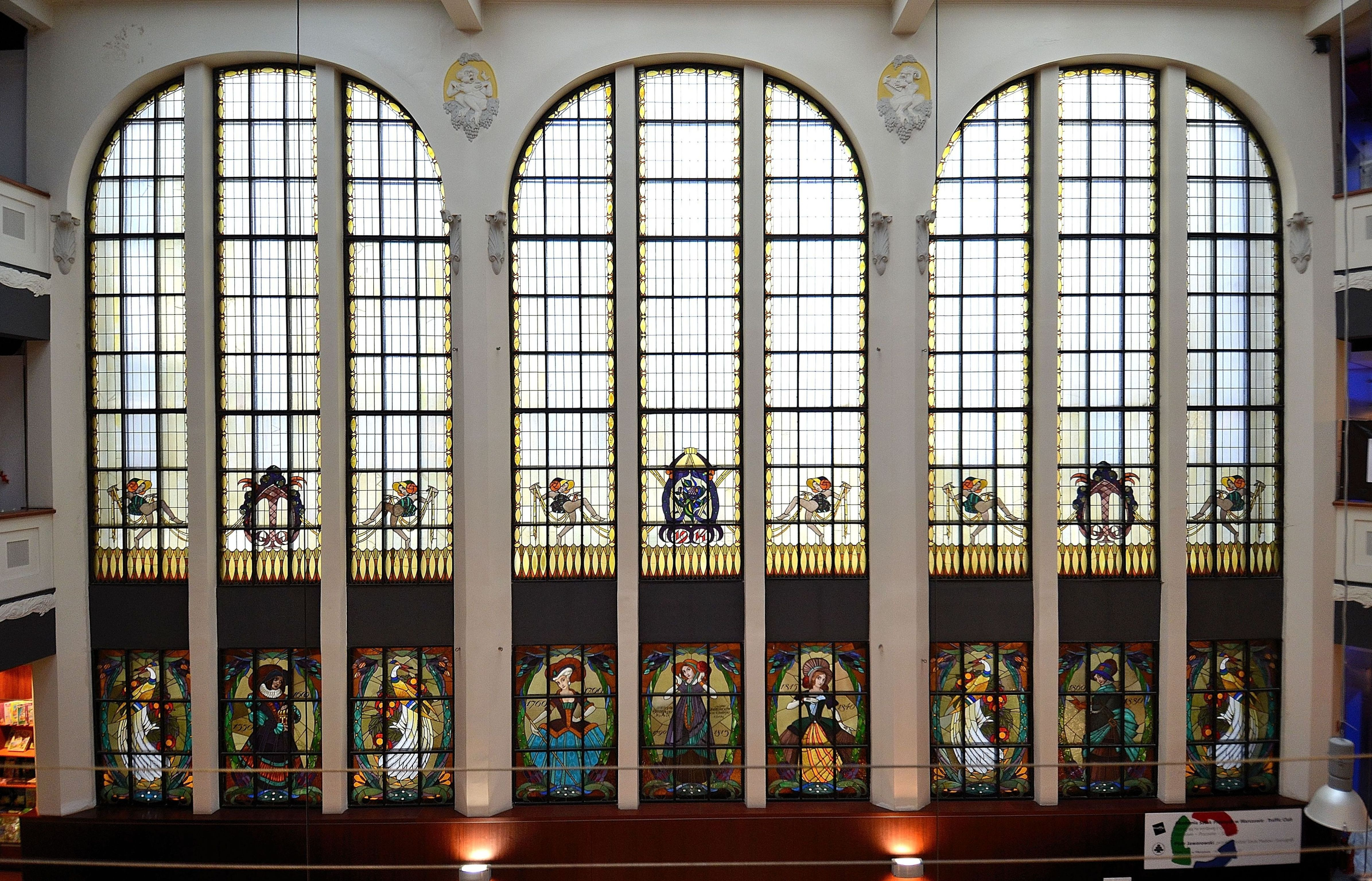
Stained glass windows of the Jabłkowski Brothers Department Store in Warsaw, Poland

In 1914 the company built the first of its large department stores in downtown Warsaw, at Bracka Street. The Warsaw-based store was the largest shop in Poland and, in addition, it housed an art gallery and a small cinema.

After the outbreak of the Polish Defensive War the store was initially closed by the new German administration. It was reopened in February 1940, but its turnover was seriously restricted by the limits on the textile trade. After the outbreak of the Warsaw Uprising of 1944, the store at Bracka street became one of the arsenals for the Armia Krajowa (Home Army). Damaged and burnt, the building survived World War II and in May 1945 the business was reopened. Despite severe shortages of practically everything, the staff gradually rose to 220 and the turnover reached half of the pre-war level. It also served as an UNRRA aid distribution point. However, during the so-called 'battle for trade', on May 15, 1950, the communist authorities confiscated the shop and closed it down the following year.

Since then the building has housed a variety of state-owned shops, including the Central House of a Child dealing with toys and children's wear (1951–1970) and then, since 1992, the Arka store. Despite being non-existent, the brand remained well known in post-war Poland and was a symbol of pre-war luxury and quality. After the collapse of the Eastern Bloc in 1989, the heirs of the Jabłkowski family started their efforts to regain the building and reopen the store. Jan Jabłkowski, aided by his family, had struggled for the return of the family's celebrated department store. In 1996 a court verdict declared the decisions of the communist tribunals null and void, and the future of the building was discussed. The Court supported the right to ownership by the Jabłkowscy family. On September 11, 2013, Jabłkowski brothers Jan and Tomasz (grandsons of Józef), Marta and Magda (daughters of Jan Jabłkowski) entered the building following a court verdict. They were accompanied by solicitors, film crew, carpenters and locksmiths as well as twenty-six security officers.

Since the return of the store in 2013, the family has been working closely with architects, conservationists and planners to modernise the facilities in the historic building whilst retaining the iconic stained-glass windows and the atrium area. Potential companies are being examined so that store will be able to offer, yet again, a unique retail experience for its customers. The opening date for the store is to be confirmed.

=== Vilnius store ===
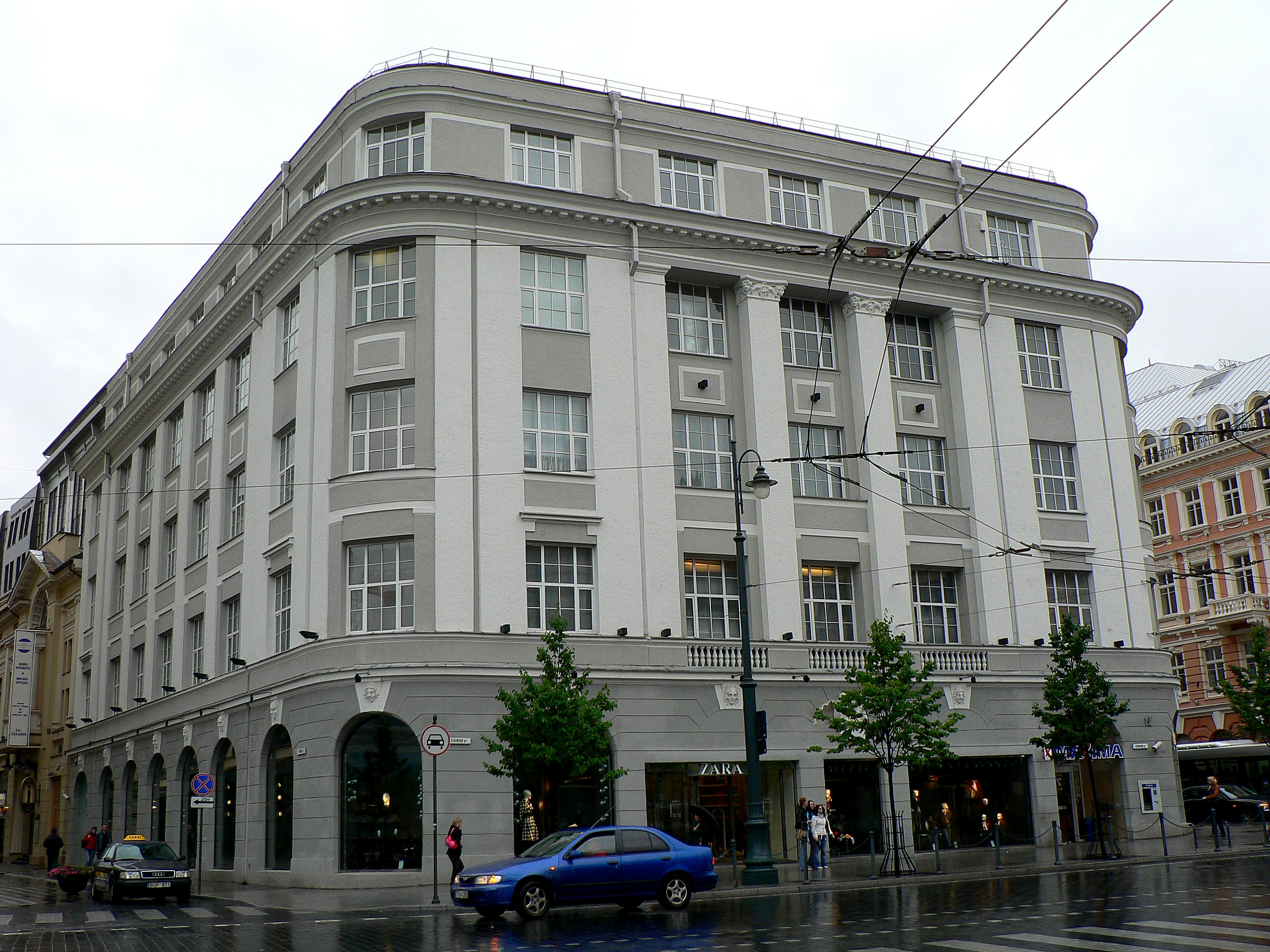
The department store building in the Gediminas Avenue of Vilnius, Lithuania (as of 2006)

In 1914, brothers Władysław and Adam Zawadski began constructing a store on the premise designed by architect Kazimierz Krzyżanowski. However, the construction was quickly interrupted due to the start of the World War I.

Due to the challenges of the war, the building was completed in a very poor condition and afterwards the Jabłkowski brothers suggested reconstructing it. They involved architectural firm of Karol Jankowski and Franciszek Lilpop, who kept the initial design, but provided some modifications for the form of the exterior and the interior design of the building, in a modernised classical style. Building's verticality was emphasised by the pilasters, decor elements were abundantly added. The works began in 1921.

The reworked store was completed and opened its doors to customers in 1923. The five-story building in the Vilnius Old Town was a smaller copy of the Warsaw shop stocking similar amounts of assortment: "On the ground floor, they sold sewing supplies, silk, wool and cotton[, undergarment, hats and tailored clothing, as well as porcelain, glassware and table cutlery]; [...]on the first floor, they sold carpets and rugs, bedspreads, and even furniture. The second floor was a textile warehouse, while the third and fourth floors housed the administration." One corner of the ground floor was occupied by a confectionary shop, and a tailor's workshop was opened in either middle or penultimate floor. An art gallery and a cinema were also included. The upper floors were shared with the Highest Guild of Merchants.

The shop experienced a downturn during the Great Depression, even entering into an administration and contracting to only the two lowest levels of the building. The middle floor was rented out to the branch of the Związek Spółek Zarobkowych i Gospodarczych bank, while the top two were leased by the Institute of Trade and Economic Sciences in Vilnius (Polish: Instytut Nauk Handlowo-Gospodarczych w Wilnie).

In 1930, Edward Kuligowski became the manager of the shop and revitalized the level of sales and the prestige of the shop. In 1937, the bank moved out to its new headquarters and the shop recovered the storey that it had previously leased them. At the start of 1939, the Wilno department store employed 120 laborers. In September 1939, the city was seized by the Soviets, who confiscated the shop and looted its goods, transporting most of them to the Soviet Union. The building survived the World War II.

After the Occupation of the Baltic states, a new department store was opened in the building, known as the "Children's World". Despite a severe shortage of goods the turnover rose and the staff reached 120 people again. In the 50s and 60s the shop maintained the status as the main and largest universal shop in the city, although its design was seen as inconveniently outdated, lacking escalators for convenient shopping, while the bourgeoisie history as ideologically undesirable by the party. The interior of the building was renovated in 1965, removing the lift next to the staircase and installing another double staircase.

However, planning for a new, larger Palace of Trades, aimed to showcase values of communism, was also started during the times, setting on a nearby location across the Neris river. The construction of it had been reported as initiated in 1965, but then was set back by the diversion of resources to remedy harm of the 1966 Tashkent earthquake. Ultimately the new mall was completed only in 1974 as the "Vilnius Central Universal Shop", which subsequently became the largest indoor shopping premises in Vilnius upon opening.
