= Museum of Occupations and Freedom Fights =

Museum in Vilnius, Lithuania

- Okupacijų ir laisvės kovų muziejus

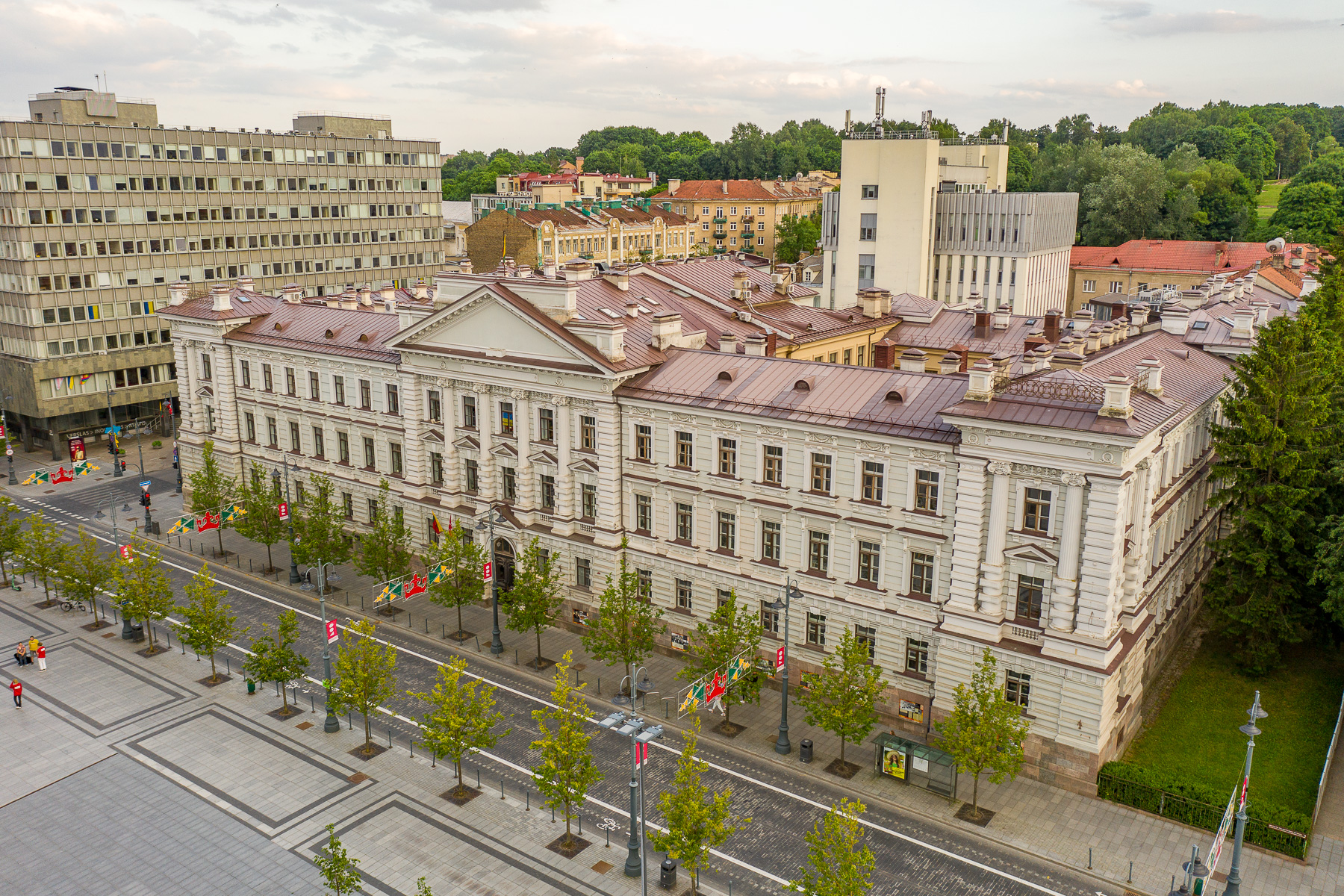
- The museum building, formerly known as "KGB headquarters"
- Established: 1992
- Location: Aukų g. 2A, LT-01113 Vilnius, Lithuania
- Coordinates: 54°41′17″N 25°16′16″E
- Website: www.genocid.lt/muziejus/en/

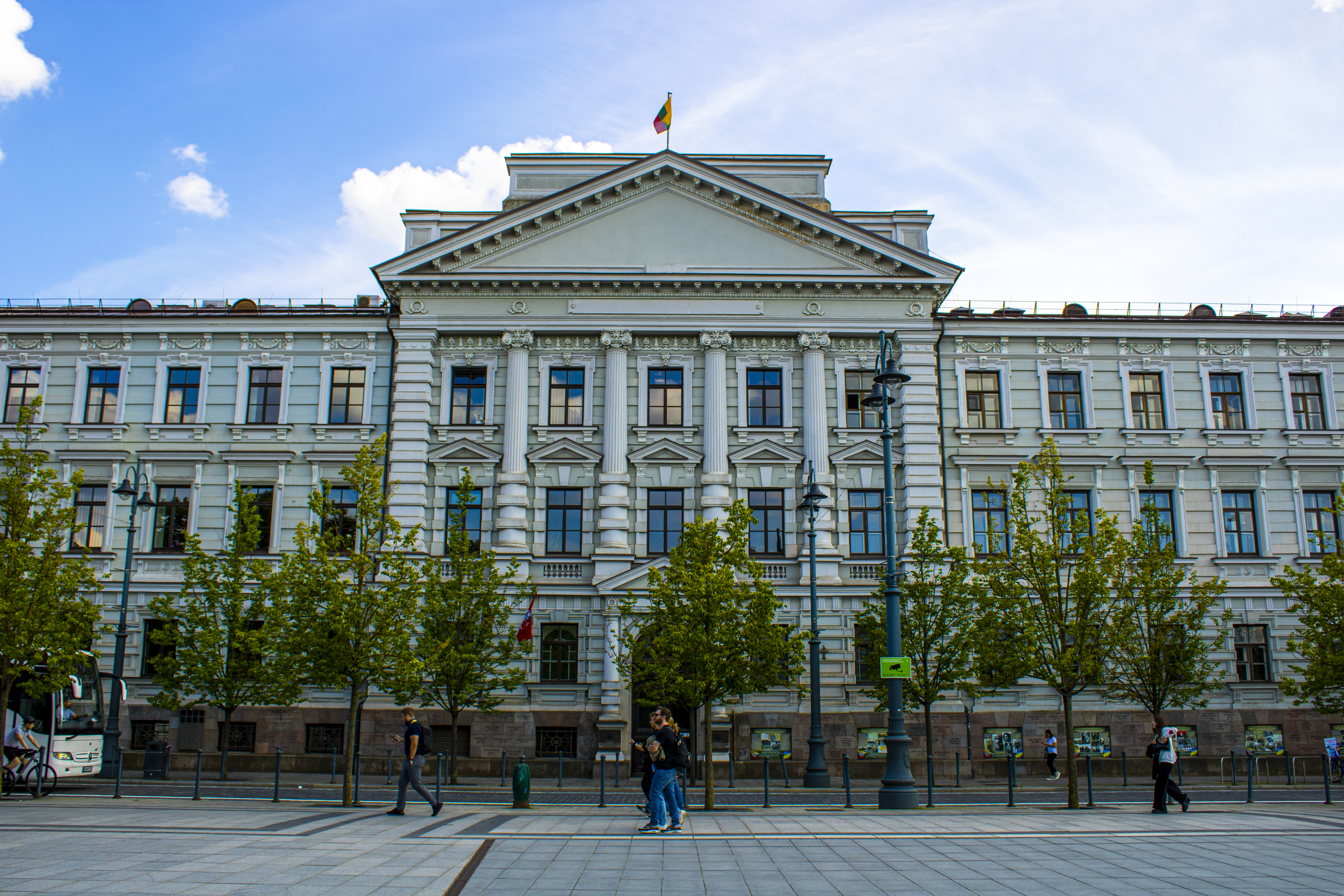
The former KGB building that hosts the museum

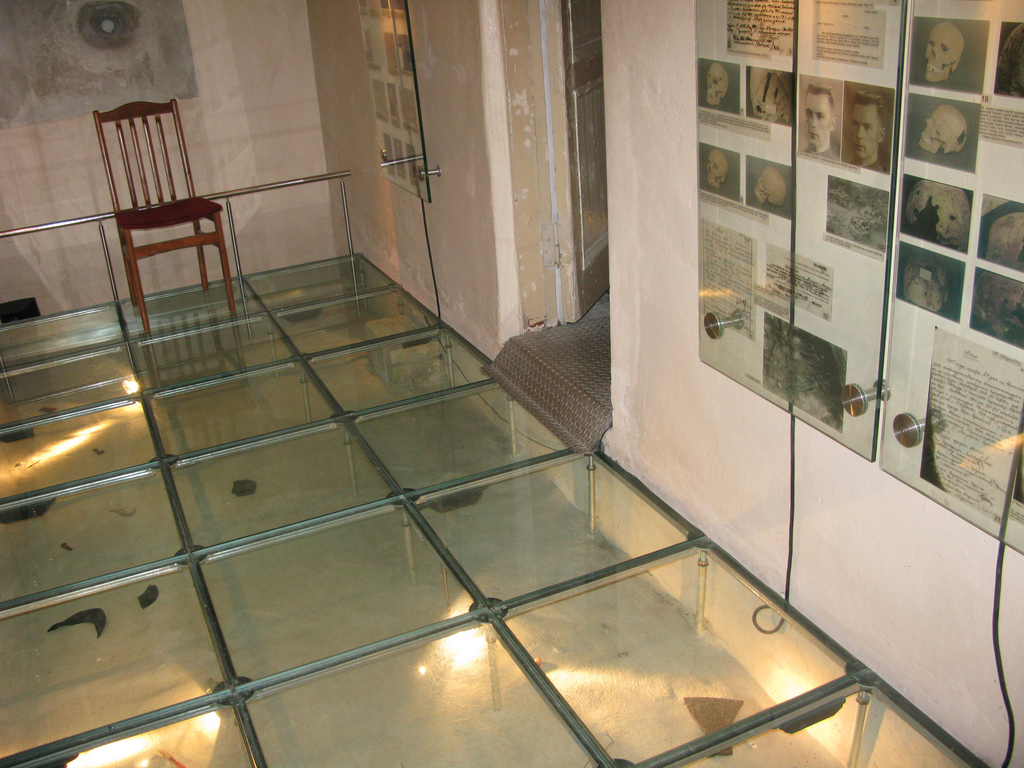
Execution room where prisoners were killed, later to be buried in mass graves outside Vilnius. Objects from the graves are displayed in the cases under the glass floor.

The Museum of Occupations and Freedom Fights (Lithuanian: Okupacijų ir laisvės kovų muziejus) in Vilnius is dedicated to showing artifacts and records from the 50-year Soviet occupation of Lithuania.

== Description ==
The museum was established in 1992 by order of the Minister of Culture and Education and the president of the Lithuanian Union of Political Prisoners and Deportees. In 1997, it was transferred to the Genocide and Resistance Research Centre of Lithuania. The museum is located in the former KGB headquarters across from the Lukiškės Square and is informally referred to as the KGB Museum.

The museum is dedicated mostly to collecting and exhibiting documents relating to the 50-year occupation of Lithuania by the Soviet Union, the anti-Soviet Lithuanian partisans, and the victims of the arrests, deportations, and executions that took place during this period. Before 2018, the museum was known as the Museum of Genocide Victims, reflecting a broadened definition of genocide used by the Genocide and Resistance Research Centre. This definition has been accepted by the European Court of Human Rights in Lithuanian genocide convictions against Soviet occupation forces.

Although these events are considered a genocide only by a few historians, just a small part of the space is devoted to the Holocaust in Lithuania, the event universally considered a genocide. In 2018, the museum was renamed the Museum of Occupations and Freedom Fights after international criticism.

== History of the building ==
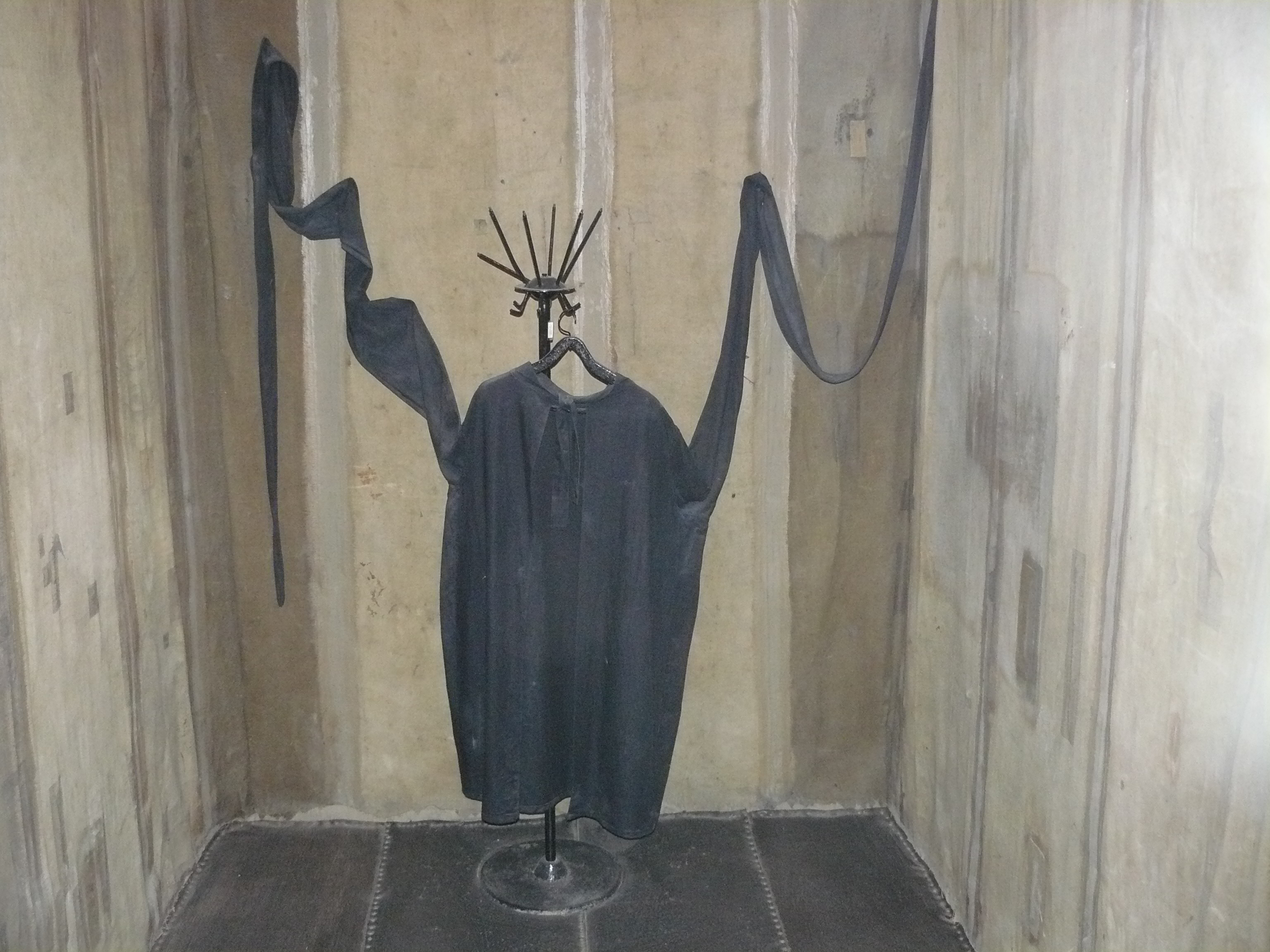
Cell with padded walls and a straitjacket, for isolation of prisoners declared mentally unstable

During the 19th century, Lithuania was part of the Russian Empire. The building, completed in 1890, originally housed the court of the Vilna Governorate. The German Empire used it during its World War I occupation of the country. After independence was declared, it served as a conscription center for the newly formed Lithuanian army and as the Vilnius commander's headquarters. During the Lithuanian Wars of Independence, the city was briefly taken by the Bolsheviks, and the building housed commissariats and a revolutionary tribunal. Following Żeligowski's Mutiny of 1920, Vilnius and its surroundings were occupied by Poland, and the building housed the courts of justice for the Wilno Voivodeship.

Lithuania was invaded by the Soviet Union in 1940, and following an ultimatum, became a Soviet Socialist Republic. Mass arrests and deportations followed, and the building's basement became a prison. In 1941 Nazi Germany invaded the country; the building then housed the Gestapo headquarters. Inscriptions on the cell walls from this era remain. The Soviets retook the country in 1944, and from then until independence was re-established in 1991, the building was used by the KGB, housing offices, a prison, and an interrogation center. Over 1,000 prisoners were executed in the basement between 1944 and the early 1960s, about one-third for resisting the occupation. Museum director Ramunė Driaučiūnaitė noted that the prison was designed for torture. Pointing out the single-celling without beds, an execution chamber marked as a kitchen on the floor plan. The Soviets covered the floor with concrete when they left. Most bodies were buried in the Tuskulėnai Manor, which underwent reconstruction and now hosts a branch of the museum.

In addition to housing the museum, the building now serves as a courthouse and as the repository of the Lithuanian Special Archives.

== Collections ==
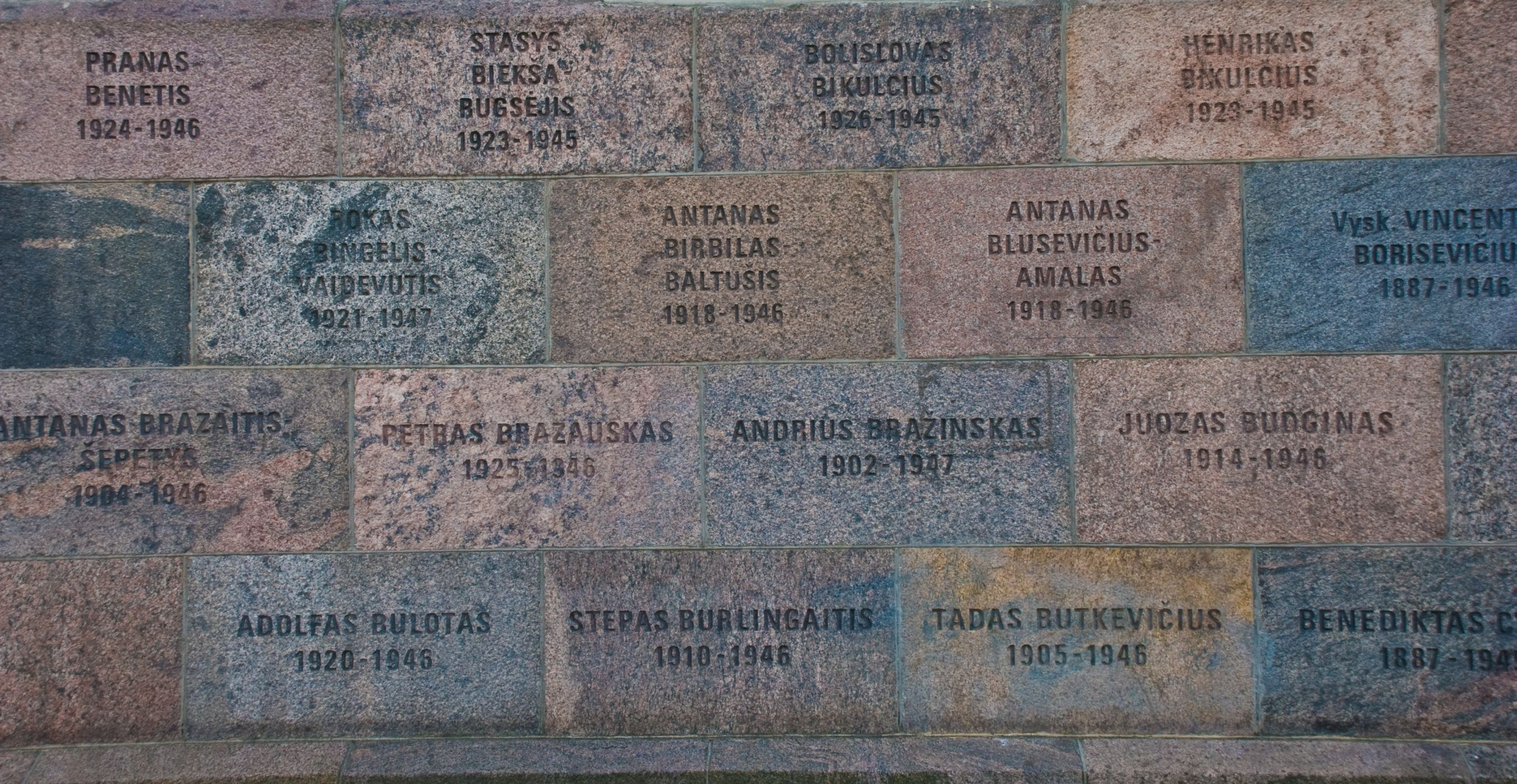
Wall outside the museum, engraved with names of those killed inside

The non-violent aspect of the resistance is represented by various books, underground publications, documents, and photographs. The collection about the Forest Brothers' armed resistance includes documents and photographs of the partisans. A section devoted to the victims of deportations, arrests, and executions holds photographs, documents, and personal belongings; this collection is continually expanded by donations from the public, seeing the museum as the best means of preserving the materials.

== Controversy ==
No exposition devoted to the Holocaust in Lithuania existed in the Museum of Genocide Victims until 2011, even though more Jews were killed in Lithuania than in Germany, both in relative and absolute numbers, and only a few historians believe Soviet repression against the Lithuanians constituted a genocide. To address international criticism, a small exposition describing the Holocaust in Lithuania was added in 2011.

In April 2018, after a piece by Rod Nordland in The New York Times quoted Dovid Katz as saying the museum was "a 21st-century version of Holocaust denial", the museum changed its name to the Museum of Occupations and Freedom Fights. According to Time Magazine, the museum "focuses almost entirely on the murder of the Lithuanian non-Jewish population, while perpetrators of the Holocaust are lauded as victims in their countries’ struggle against Soviet occupation."

== See also ==
- Double genocide theory
