= Ostra Bramatoppen =

Mountain in Svalbard, Norway

- Ostra Brama
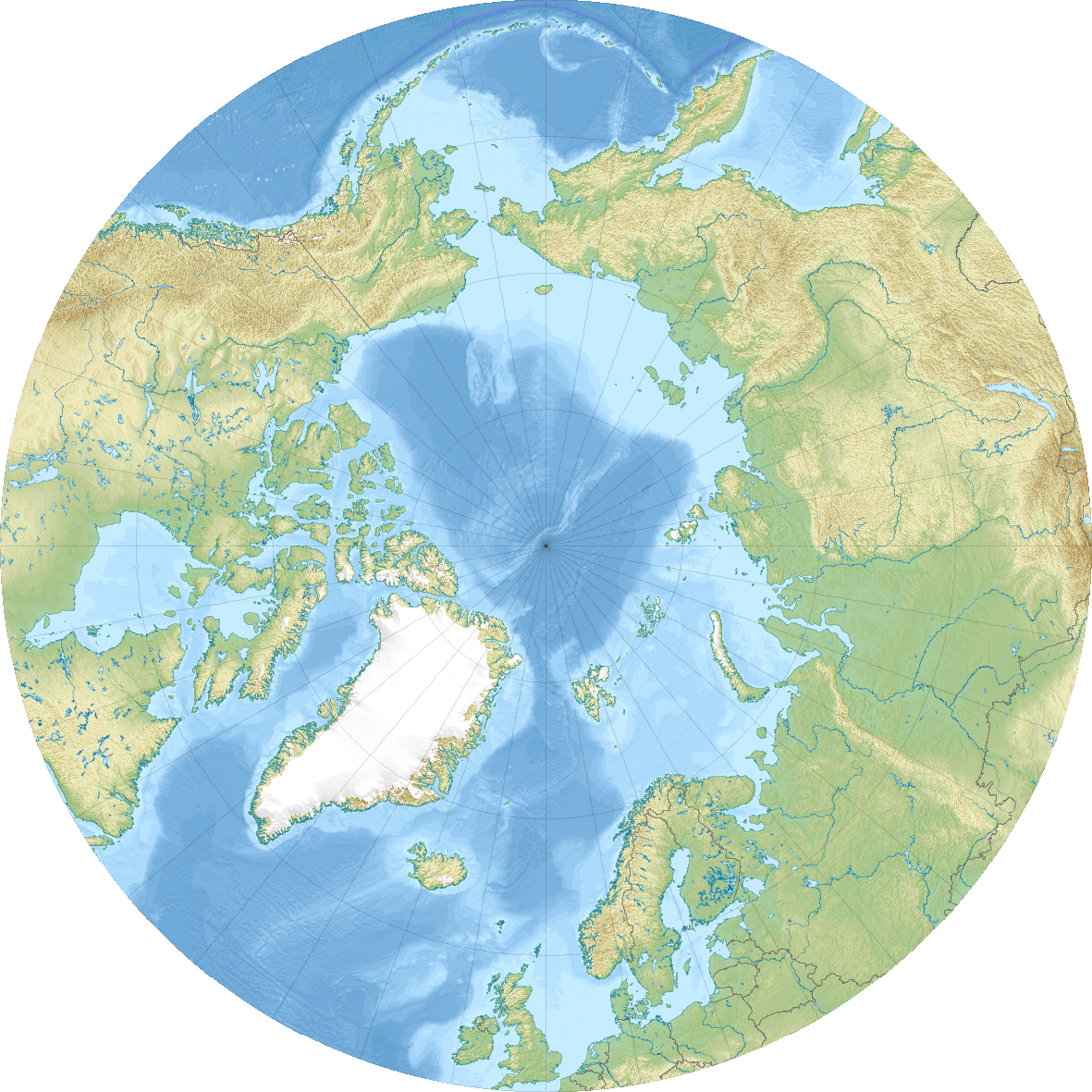
- Location within Svalbard Location within Arctic

Highest point
- Elevation: 1.035 m (3.40 ft)
- Coordinates: 77°09′N 15°24′E

Geography
- Location: Svalbard, Norway

Ostra Bramatoppen, Polish: Ostra Brama, is the highest mountain of the Pilsudskifjella Mountains in the Svalbard archipelago (Norway). It has a height of 1.035 m.a.s.l. and is located in the southwest corner of the island of Spitsbergen. The mountain was named in 1934 by the participants in the Polish scientific expedition with reference to the Gate of Dawn (Polish: Ostra Brama) in the then Polish city of Wilno, where two members of the expedition came from, and where the professor of zoology was Michał Siedlecki, father of geologist Stanisław Siedlecki, who participated in the expedition.
