= Church of St. Theresa, Vilnius =

Roman Catholic church in Vilnius, Lithuania

Church of St. Theresa
- Šv. Teresės bažnyčia (Lithuanian)
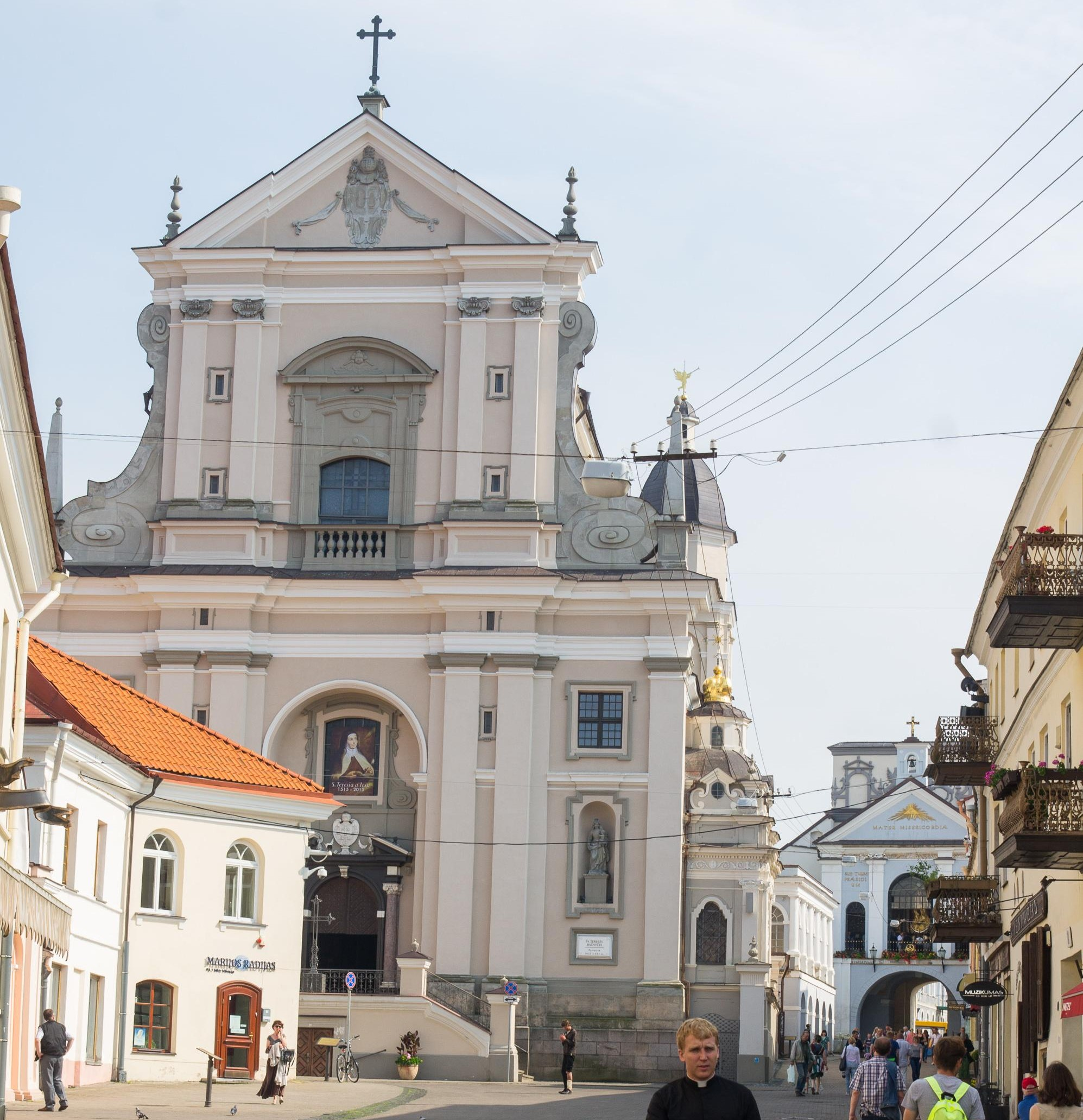
- Façade of St. Theresa's and Gate of Dawn visible in the right side

Religion
- Affiliation: Roman Catholic
- Diocese: Vilnius
- Ecclesiastical or organisational status: Church
- Year consecrated: 1652 or 1654

Location
- Location: Vilnius, Lithuania
- Interactive map of Church of St. Theresa
- Coordinates: 54°40′30″N 25°17′22″E

Architecture
- Architects: John Ulrich, Costante Tencalla (main façade), Johann Christoph Glaubitz (after 1760)
- Type: Church
- Style: Baroque, Rococo, Classicism
- Completed: 1650
- Materials: Plastered masonry, marble, granite, and sandstone

Website
- Ausrosvartai.lt

UNESCO World Heritage Site
- Official name: Vilnius Old Town
- Type: Cultural
- Criteria: Cultural: (ii), (iv)
- Designated: 1994
- Reference no.: 541
- UNESCO region: Europe

Church of St. Theresa (Lithuanian: Šv. Teresės bažnyčia) (Note: in other languages also known as: Latin: Ecclesia Sanctae Theresiae, Ukrainian: Костел Святої Терези, Belarusian: Касцёл Святой Тэрэзы, Polish: Kościół św. Teresy; Russian: Церковь Святой Терезы.) is a Roman Catholic church in Vilnius' Old Town, close to the Gate of Dawn. It was completed in 1650, and it is dedicated to Teresa of Ávila. The church is of Baroque, Rococo, Classicism architectural styles and is the oldest Baroque monument without a tower in the current territory of Lithuania.

== History ==
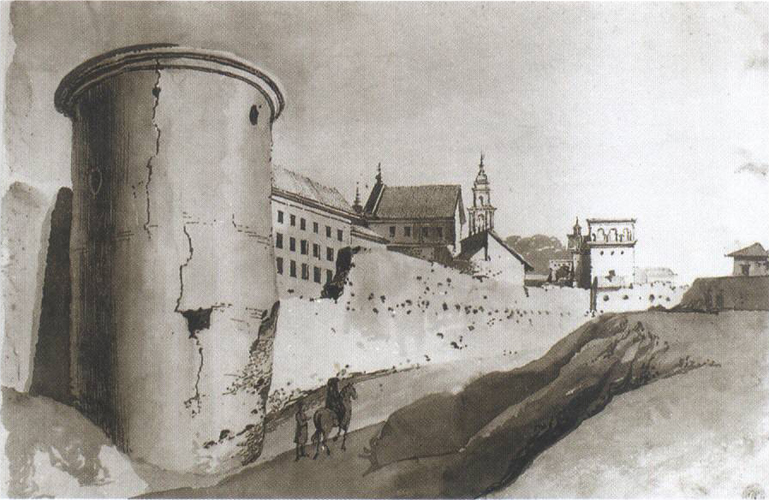
The Wall of Vilnius and the Church of St. Theresa (in the middle), late 18th century

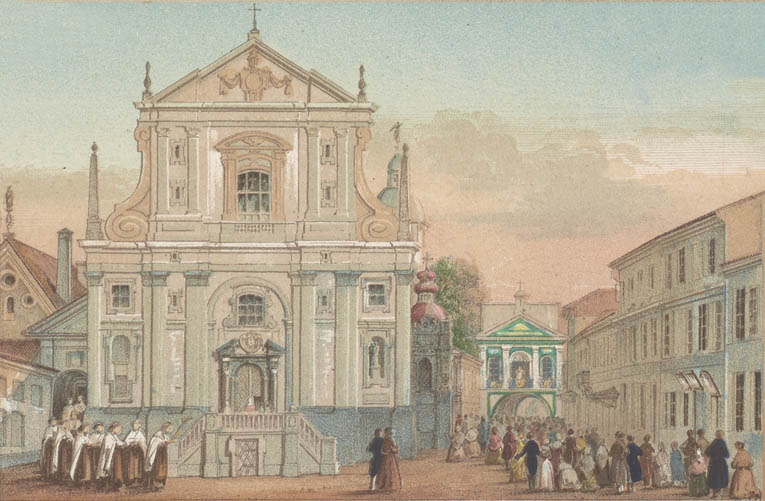
Painting of the Church of St. Theresa and Gate of Dawn, 1850

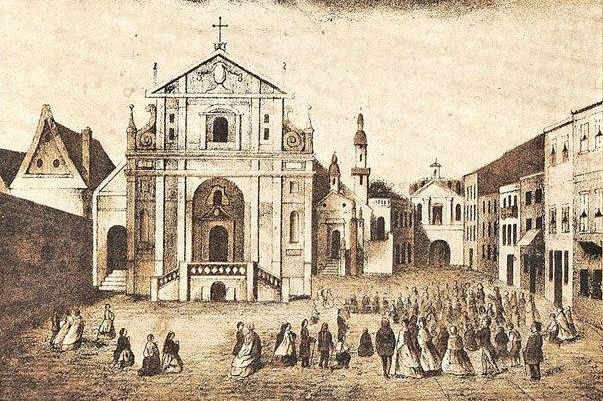
Church of St. Theresa and Carmelites Monastery near the Gate of Dawn in 1860

In 1626, the Discalced Carmelites, who arrived to Vilnius, Lithuania from Lublin, Poland, with the support of the Burgomaster of Vilnius, Ignatius Dubavičius, and his brother Stephen, began the construction of a monastery near the Gate of Dawn. Initially, only small buildings were erected, but these were expanded and enlarged between 1633 and 1654. During that period, the buildings had high gable roofs, and the interior spaces were covered with cross or barrel vaults. Following successive expansions the monastery had several inner courtyards. In 1627, a wooden church was built within the complex, and in 1644 the monastery’s farm buildings were added. The monastery was established in a part of the city known as civitas Ruthenica, inhabited mainly by Ruthenians, opposite the Ruthenian Uniate Basilian monastery.

Beyond the Wall of Vilnius a brickworks of the Discalced Carmelites functioned in the 17th century. In 1633, the Discalced Carmelites monks received financial support from the Pac family. With funding provided by the Lithuanian Vice-chancellor Stefan Pac a new masonry Church of St. Theresa was built and its façade has remained largely unchanged to the present day. The church was designed and supervised by the architect of the Radziwiłł family's manor, John Ulrich. The main façade was designed by the Swiss–Italian architect and sculptor Costante Tencalla and was built of marble, granite, and sandstone. The construction was completed in 1650, and in 1652 (according to other sources in 1654) it was consecrated by the Bishop of Vilnius, Jerzy Tyszkiewicz. St. Theresa’s Church is the oldest surviving Baroque monument without a tower within the present-day territory of Lithuania (e.g. older Corpus Christi Church in Nyasvizh, which for centuries was a part of the Grand Duchy of Lithuania, is now in Belarus).

In 1760, the church burned down, but was soon rebuilt according to the design of architect Johann Christoph Glaubitz. After the fire, the arched roof was bricked up and a bell tower was built. In 1763–1765, the interior of the church was painted by the Vilnius artist Maciej Słuszczański, the space was decorated with sculptures and frescos in the Rococo style. Nine altars have survived from this period. In 1783, the mausoleum chapel of the Lord Jesus (also called the Pociej Family Chapel) with a vaulted dome was built with the funds of the Rahachow starosta Michał Pociej and under it the burial crypt of the Pociej family was constructed.

During the French invasion of Russia the Grande Armée in 1812 devastated the interior of the church. Following the war, restoration works were undertaken in 1820 and continued in subsequent years. The damaged altars and interior decorations were repaired and restored. However, in 1844, the tsarist authorities closed the monastery and expelled the Discalced Carmelites. The church was subsequently converted into a parish church, and an independent parish was established alongside it. The former monastery buildings were transformed into military barracks and later adapted for various civilian purposes.

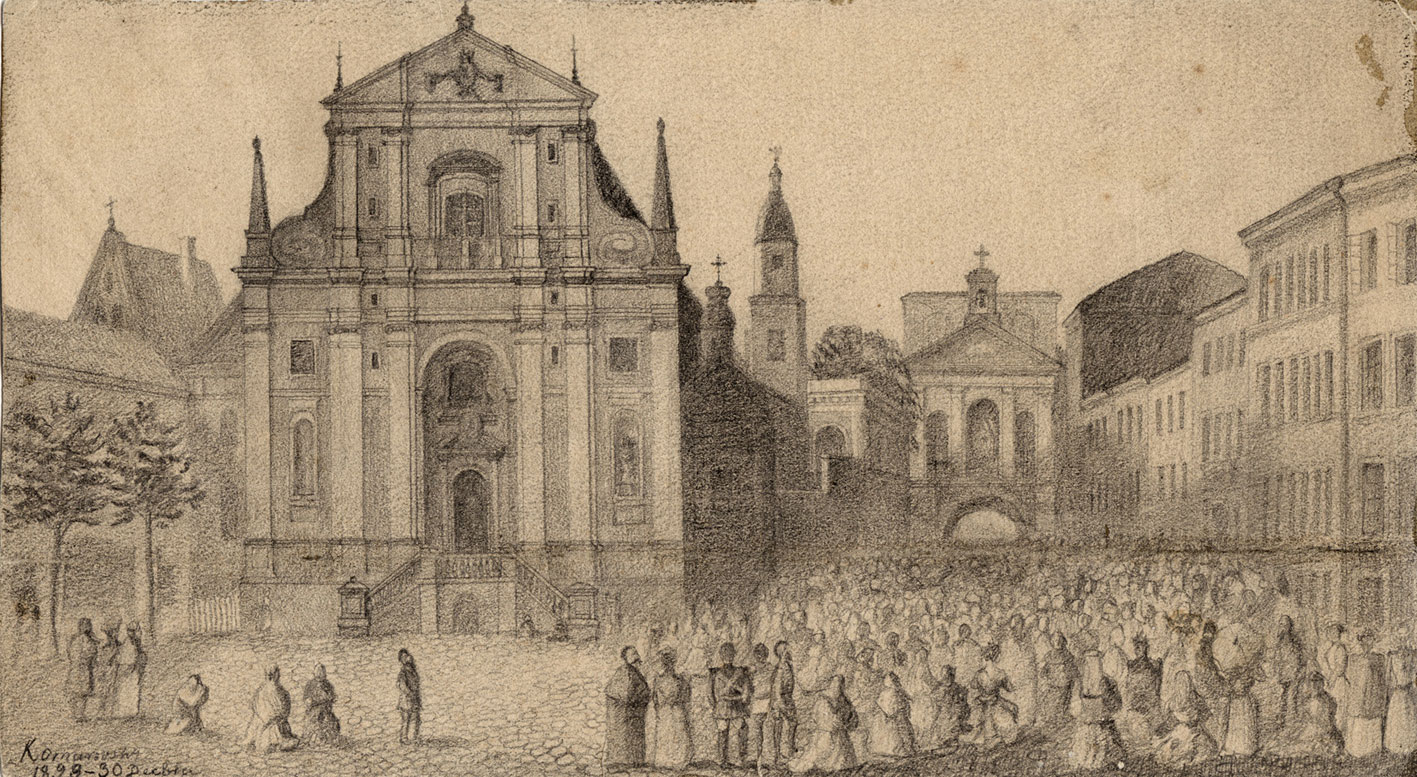
Painting of the Church of St. Theresa and Gate of Dawn, 1899

In order to preserve the condition and artistic value of the building, renovation works were carried out in the second half of the 19th century. In 1857 and 1895, the church was partially restored, and both its façade and interior elements were repaired. These interventions aimed not only to eliminate damage caused by time and earlier wars, but also to preserve the building’s authentic Baroque and Classicist features. From 1861 to 1915, a girls’ school operated in the monastery buildings, and from 1918 to 1931 they housed a girls’ dormitory maintained by the Central Committee of the Lithuanian Charity Society. At that time, schoolgirls, artisans, and craft workshops lived here. In 1912, during the indulgence of the patronage of the Mother of God, Lithuanians were allowed additional morning services and sermons in the Lithuanian language.

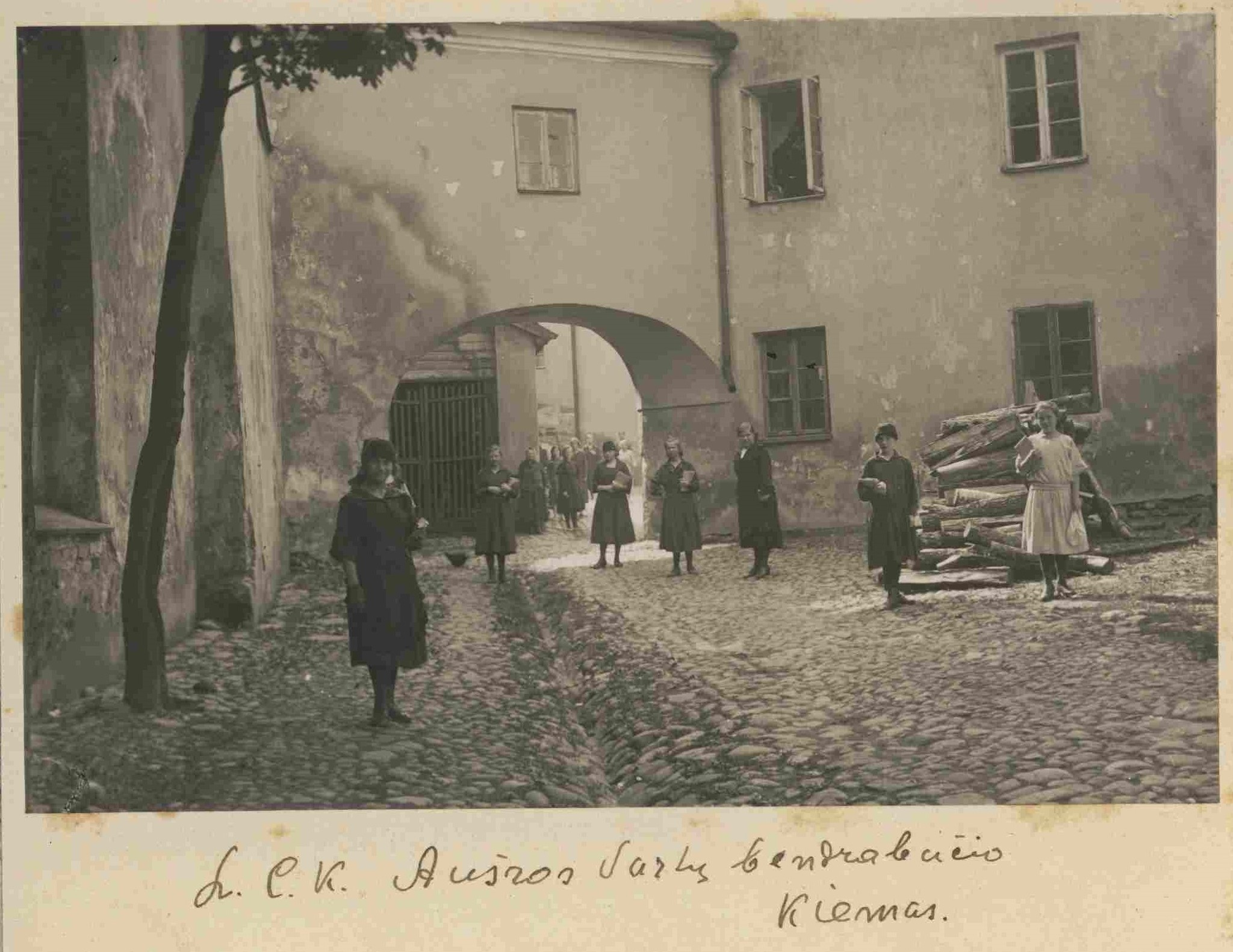
From 1918 to 1931, a girls' dormitory operated in the Carmelite monastery, maintained by the Central Committee of the Lithuanian Charity Society. It housed schoolgirls, artisans, and a girls' craft workshop. Photographed in 1924.

The Discalced Carmelites returned to Vilnius during the interwar period, after an absence of almost a century. In 1927–1929, major restoration works were carried out on the church, led by the Polish architect, professor of the Vilnius University, Juliusz Kłos. During this restoration, particular attention was paid to preserving the building’s architectural details and strengthening its structural integrity. An expert in historic architecture, Kłos sought to emphasize the church’s most valuable features. This period is therefore regarded as one of the most significant in the history of the complex’s conservation, as it helped preserve the building’s authentic appearance.

After World War II, when the Soviet Union authorities closed the monastery again, the Discalced Carmelites activities in Vilnius ceased. Nevertheless, the Church of St. Theresa, unlike many other churches in Vilnius due to the Soviet policies of atheism, was not turned into a warehouse or gallery. The Church of St. Theresa functioned as a parish church throughout the Soviet period. This helped to preserve the unique Rococo interior, frescoes by Maciej Słuszczański, and the altar funded by the Pac family from destruction. In 1971–1976, the church was repainted and repaired, and the interior was restored (the restoration works were led by the Lithuanian architect Vidmantas Vitkauskas).

Following the Re-Establishment of the State of Lithuania in 1990, the Church of St. Theresa and its ensemble is consistently maintained. In 2018–2020, a project supported by the European Union was implemented during which the façade of church was restored, the Pociej Family Chapel was renovated, the cellars were renovated and an exhibition for visitors was installed. The church is an important part of the pilgrimage route, as it is directly connected to the Gate of Dawn Chapel, and the church, together with the Gate of Dawn, forms one of the most important religious and tourist centers of Vilnius. Nowadays, services in the Church of St. Theresa are held in Lithuanian and Polish languages.

== Architecture ==
=== Exterior ===
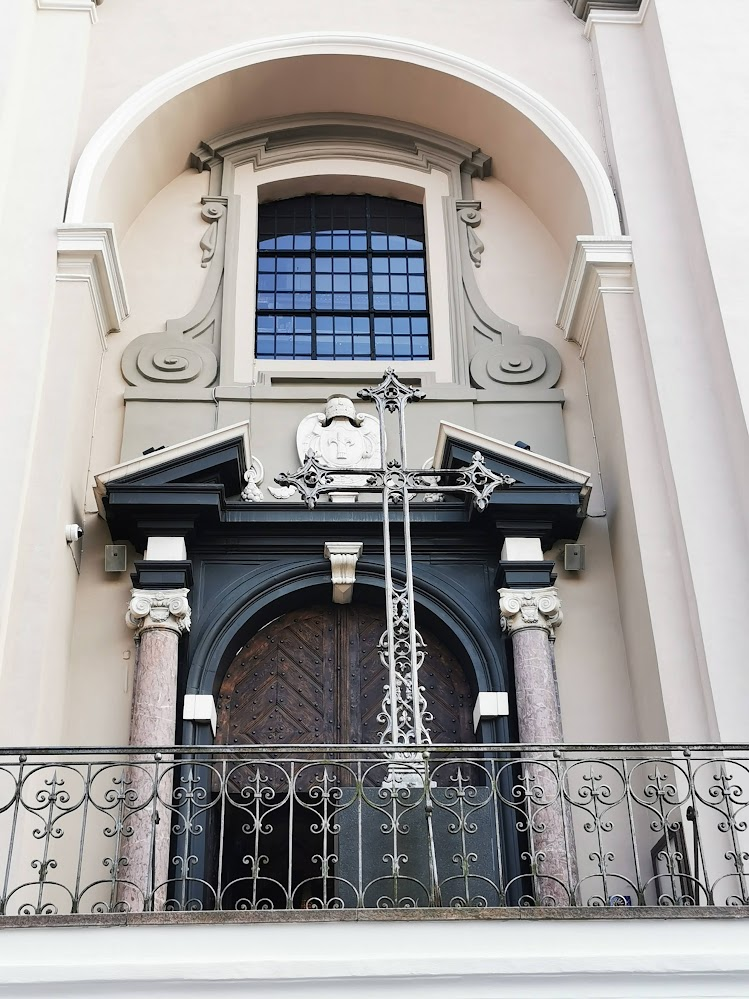
Tympanum with the coat of arms of the House of Vasa

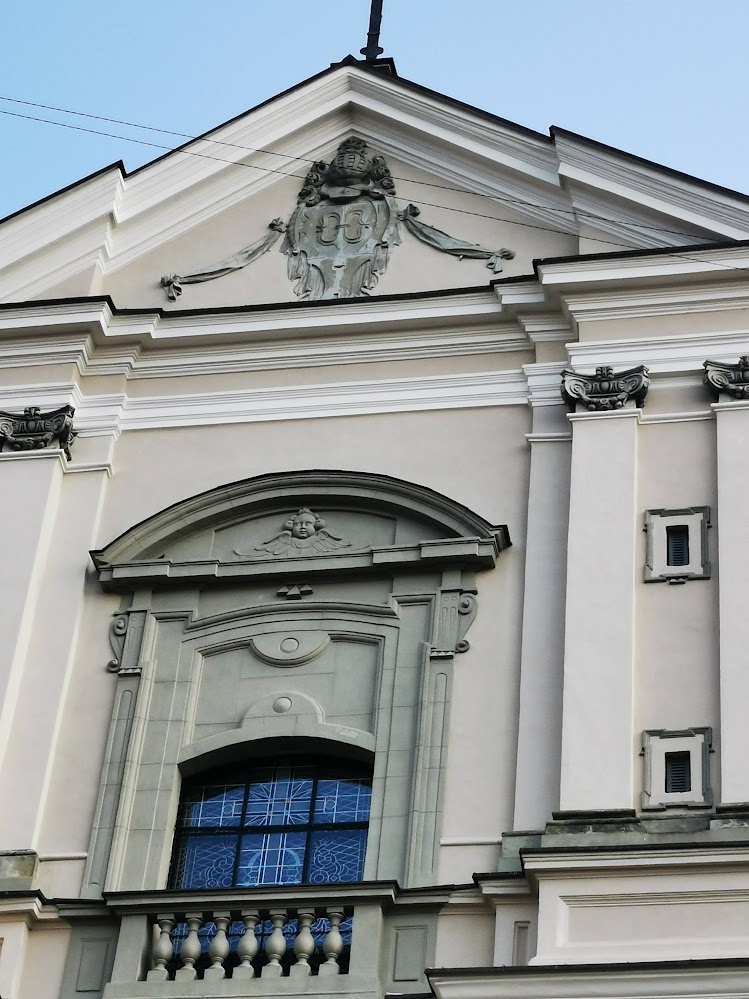
The main entrance of the church with the Gozdawa coat of arms of the church's fundators Pac family

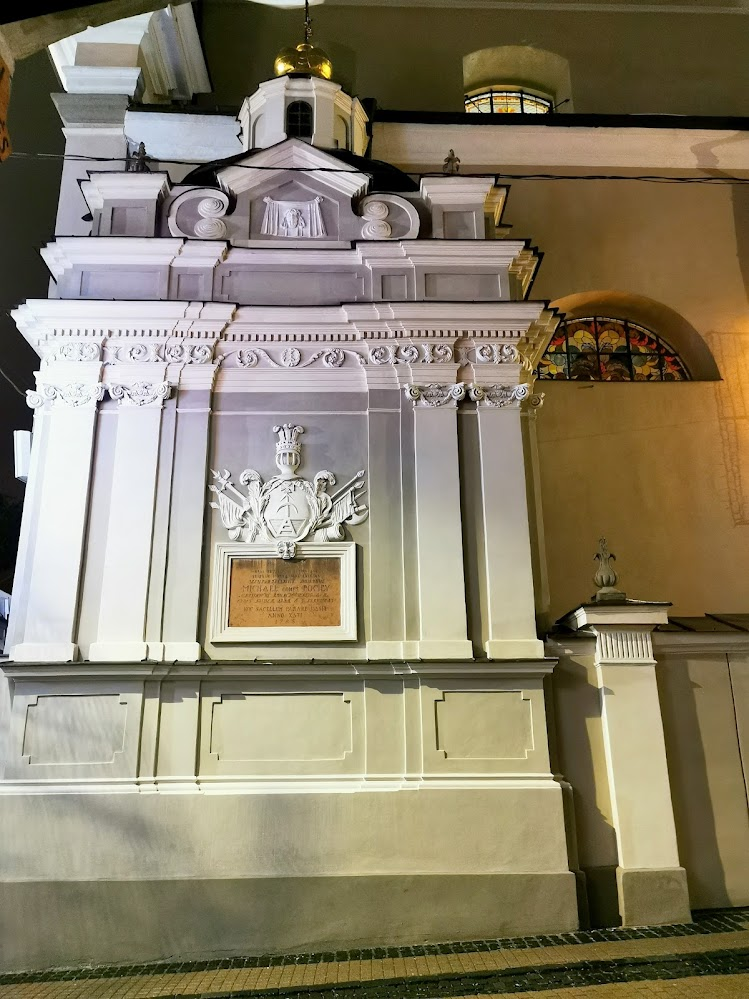
Pociej Chapel with the coat of arms of the family

The St. Teresa's Church in Vilnius is an early Baroque, asymmetrical plan, domeless basilica sanctuary. Its architectural composition was inspired by the example of the Church of the Gesù in Rome. The late Baroque Pociej Chapel with a dome and a massive brick bell tower adjoins the northern part of the main body, and a corridor is located on the eastern side. The interior space of the church is complemented by two chapels: the aforementioned Pociej Chapel and the Chapel of the Holy Virgin Mary, in which the original, richly decorated Baroque altar has survived. The monastery ensemble behind the high altar consists of several buildings, forming two closed inner courtyards. The old monastery garden extends all the way to Mikalojus Daukša Street, where the massive brick wall of the monastery directly connects with the surviving part of the Wall of Vilnius.

The church building is built of brick, but its exterior decoration is distinguished by its special luxury. The high plinth is covered with broken Swedish sandstone, rare black and white marble and granite were also used for the decoration of the main façade. The two-span façade is divided by paired pilasters: Doric at the bottom and Corinthian at the top, which give the walls plasticity and vertical dynamics. The columns of the main entrance portal are carved from solid granite and decorated with white marble details. The window and door frames, the balcony balustrade, two decorative pyramids on the sides of the facade and the coats of arms of the founders, the House of Pac, crowned with royal crowns, are also made from these precious materials.

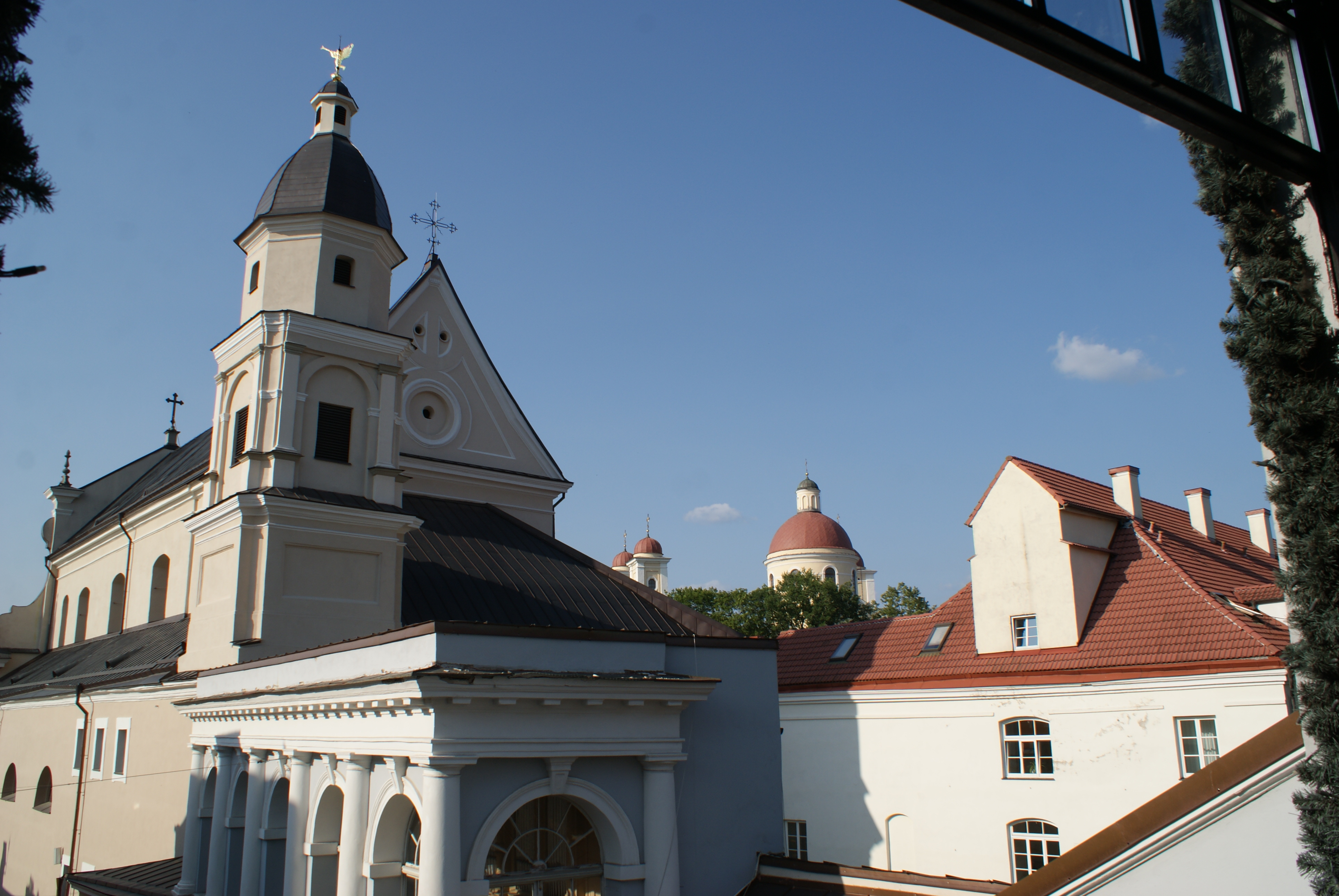
View to the church from the Chapel of the Gate of Dawn

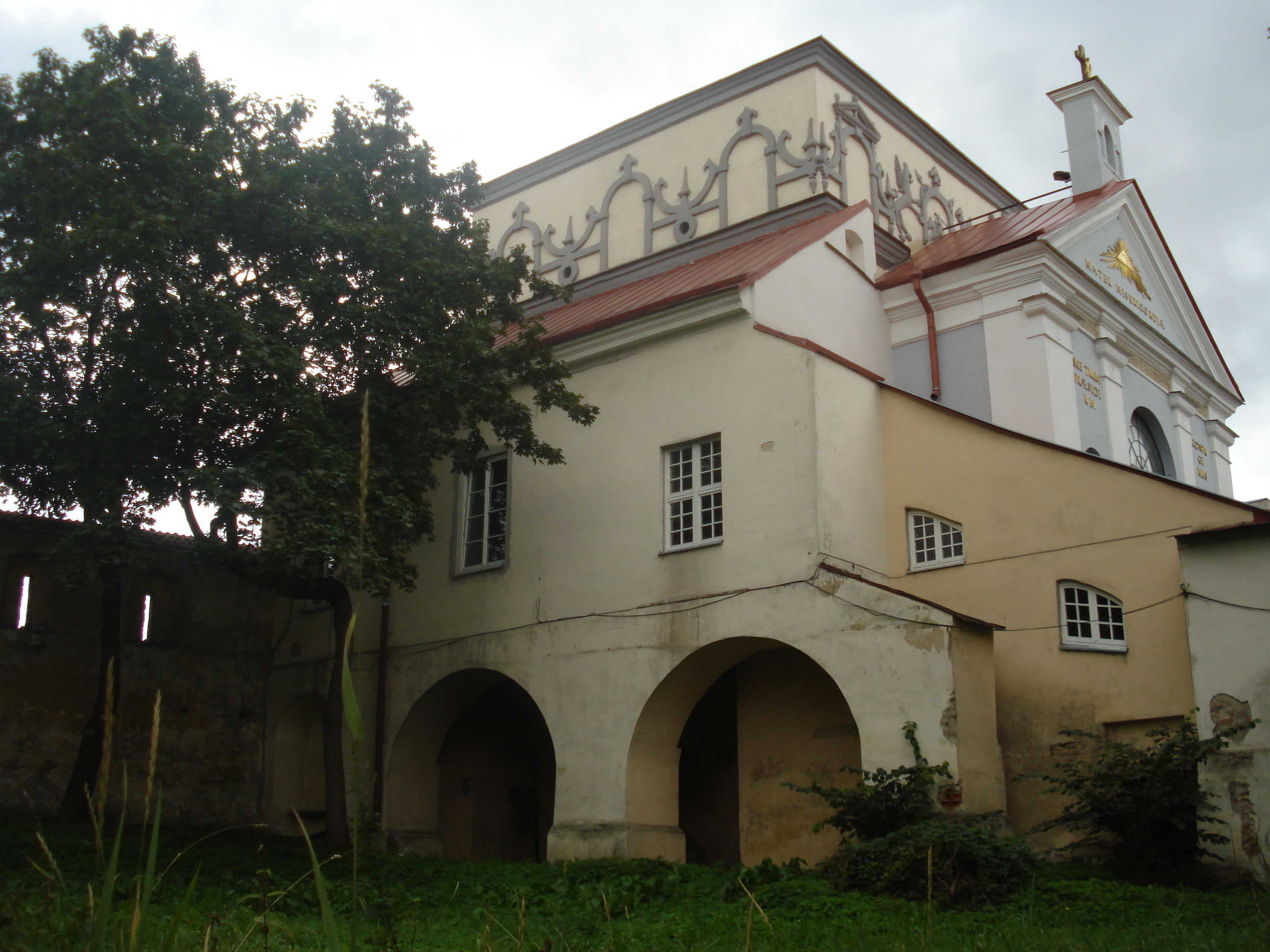
Gallery connecting the monastery to the Chapel of the Gate of Dawn

Both sections of the façade are connected by graceful volutes with decorative vases, which visually hide the roofs of the lower side naves. The architectural ensemble is complemented by a brick two-story closed gallery, connecting the interior of the church with the Chapel of the Gate of Dawn. The volume of the building is covered by a high gable roof, supported by a complex structure of double brick arches. The top of the façade is crowned by a massive triangular pediment, on the tympanum of which the dynastic coat of arms of the House of Vasa flaunts, testifying to the support of the Polish–Lithuanian monarch Władysław IV Vasa for the sanctuary. Artistic wrought-metal crosses are raised on the roofs, and the spire of the bell tower is decorated with a Baroque weather vane in the form of a trumpeting angel. The Pociej Chapel is completed by a graceful dome with a lantern.

The side façades of the church are characterized by more restrained forms, which contrast with the representative luxury of the main façade. They are divided by massive pilasters and high, semicircular arch-shaped windows, ensuring the illumination of the central nave. Since the church is of the basilica type, the wall of the central nave with skylights rises above the lower side naves, giving the building volume a characteristic Baroque staircasing.

The southern façade is closely connected to the monastery ensemble, so some of its elements are integrated into the closed inner courtyard. The two-story gallery visible here not only connects the church with the Chapel of the Gate of Dawn, but also visually completes the southern part of the ensemble. The northern façade is more open and better visible from the street; the Pociej Chapel is adjacent to it. The light-plastered flatness of the walls is highlighted by the Baroque window surrounds and cornices. The rear façade of the church is smooth, finished with a triangular pediment with an iron cross. This part of the building directly borders the monastery choir spaces, which were intended for the prayers of the Discalced Carmelites separately from the laity.

The monastery buildings are characterized by modest late Renaissance forms. Their internal plan is a corridor type: living and auxiliary rooms are located on both sides of a one-way corridor. Rooms and passages are covered with cross and cylindrical vaults with lunettes. The vaults of some spaces, for example, the former library and the refectory, are decorated with a geometric pattern of stucco ribs. The outbuildings are two-storey, their internal space is divided into rooms of various sizes by transverse walls. The façades of all buildings in the ensemble are smooth, decorated with profiled eaves of the roof. The planes of the façades are divided by rectangular, segmental and semicircular arched windows.

=== Interior ===
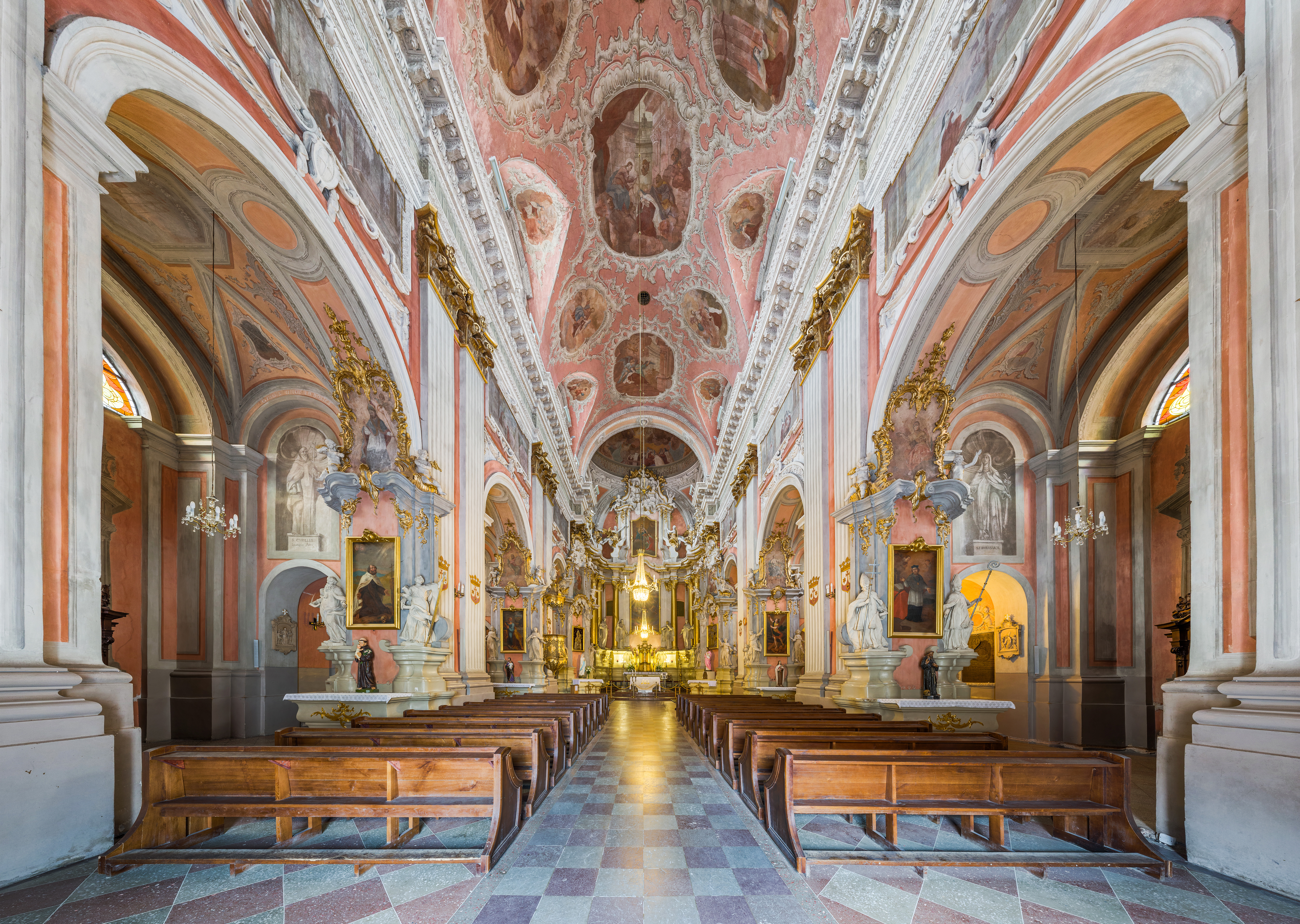
Interior of the church, looking towards the great altar

The interior of the church is characterized by the stylistic harmony of late Baroque and Rococo (except for the more restrained Pociej Chapel), rich decor and spatial dynamics. The sanctuary is a three-nave, basilica type. The main nave is separated from the side nave by massive piers decorated with double pilasters, which support barrel vaults with lunettes.

The central nave is twice as wide and higher than the side ones, covered with a massive cylindrical vault, which gives the space grandeur. The piers are connected by high semicircular arches, forming a single rhythm of the altar and chapels. The side naves are divided by arched niches into separate, but interconnected, transitional chapels.

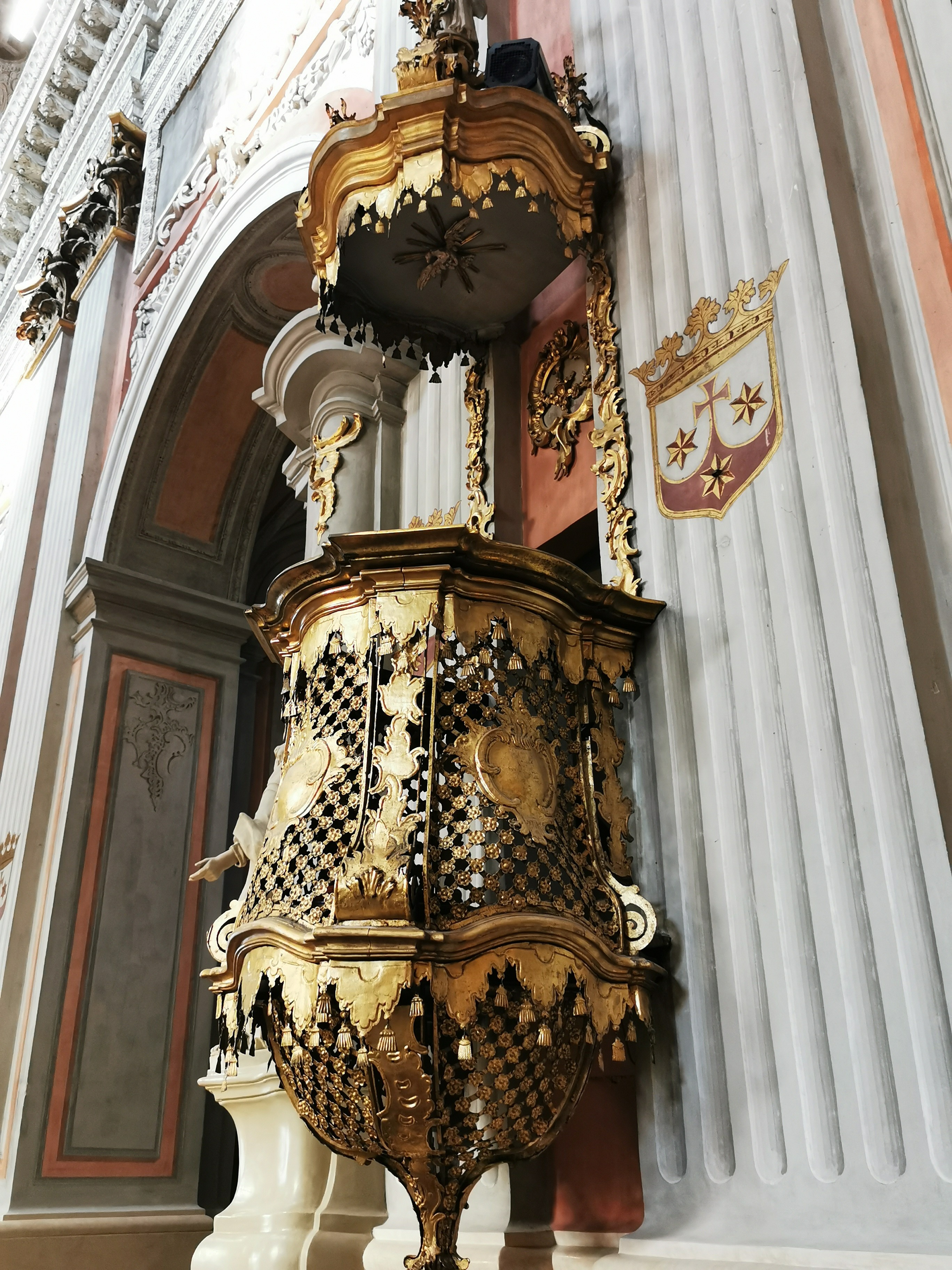
Gilded pulpit

The interior of the church is decorated with nine altars made of sandstone and richly decorated with Rococo-style ornaments and plaster moldings. Some of the decorative details are gilded or bronzed, and all the altars are visually framed by graceful columns. The architectural ensemble of the great altar of St. Theresa consists of a two-tiered altarpiece, rising above a wavy podium. The central part is accentuated by a mensa decorated with gilded rocaille and a Rococo tabernacle. The structure of the first tier is defined by Corinthian columns and pilasters arranged in a semicircle, between which four sculptures are symmetrically arranged: Albertus Magnus, the prophet Elijah, Dominic de Guzmán, and Angelus of Jerusalem. The mystical plot of the Piercing of the Heart of St. Theresa painted by Szymon Czechowicz dominates the centre of the altarpiece. The second stage of the altar is characterized by a unique plasticity: the pilasters, which are close to the wall at the top, separate as they descend and turn into freely undulating planes. This element, which is not characteristic of late Vilnian Baroque, gives the composition its uniqueness. The graceful figures of angels arranged on these detached planes draw the eye to the Polish–Lithuanian painter Kanuty Rusiecki's 19th century painting The Holy Virgin Mary with the Infant Jesus and St. Casimir. The image of Saint Casimir, the patron saint of Lithuania, here is symbolic as it was he who became the intercessor of the newly established Lithuanian province of the Discalced Carmelites in 1734. The entire ensemble is crowned with a gloria with a heart in the centre, which is connected to clouds and angels.

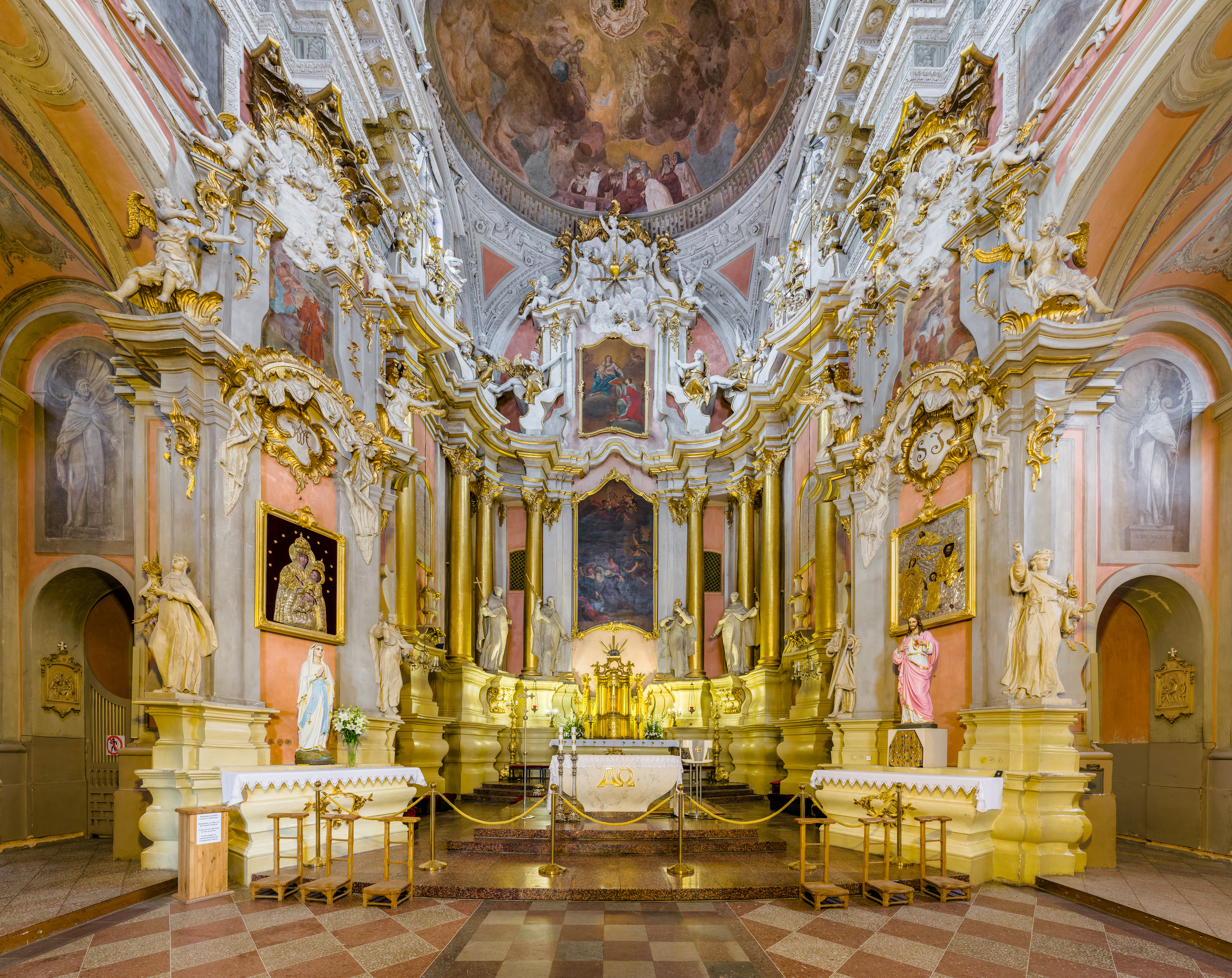
The great altar of the church

The great altar of St. Theresa is connected with the side altars of the Scapular of Our Lady of Mount Carmel and Saint Joseph (sometimes also called altar of St. John of the Cross) by ingenious late Baroque sculpture. The left altar contains a valuable painting of the Scapular of Our Lady of Mount Carmel, created in the 18th century; the image of the Holy Family on the altar of St. Joseph is also attributed to the same unknown painter. The left altar contains the sculptures of St. Theresa and St. Joseph, and the right altar contains the sculptures of King David and the allegorical Silence (Asceticism).

In the arched openings of the naves, near the pillars, are incorporated smaller two-tiered altars, in the pediments of which wall painting compositions are subtly integrated. The upper part of the walls of the central nave is decorated with rectangular scenes from the lives of saints; they are framed by decorative borders and are characterized by greater staticity than the vault paintings. In the side naves, above the arched openings, 20 figures of saints are painted, the monochrome technique of which imitates sculptures.

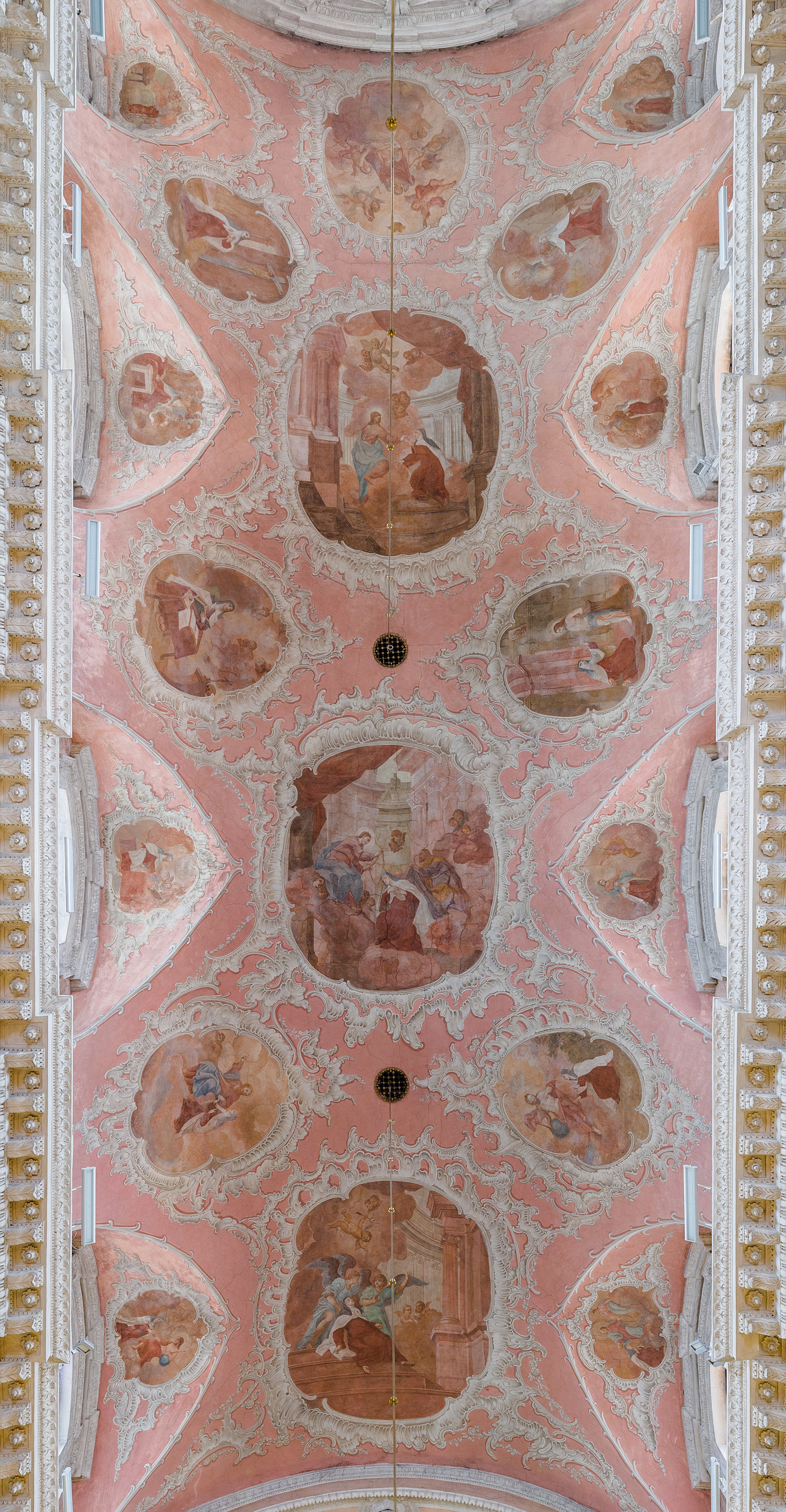
Vaults frescoes, dating to the mid-18th century

The walls and vaults of the church are one of the most valuable ensembles of mid-18th century wall paintings in Vilnius. This fresco cycle is attributed to the late Baroque. The church frescoes are unique and the only surviving artistic legacy of the former province of the Discalced Carmelites. The emergence of these wall paintings was dictated by the fire that broke out in Aušros Vartų Street in 1760. After it, until 1763, the monks repaired the sanctuary, and the provincial Vladislovas Jevasevičius took care of its decoration. Although the church annals mention the painter Samuelis Dorosevičius, who previously worked here and was later buried, it is not known for sure whether the walls were painted before the fire. The main works, completed in September 1763, are attributed to the artist Matthias Słuszczański. According to Stanislovas Lorencs, the frescoes were renovated in 1853, damaged during the restoration of 1895 and in 1927–1929 the restorers, led by Juliusz Kłos, tried to restore the original paintings and some paint-covered frescoes (St. John, St. Mary Magdalene, The Crowning of Christ with Thorns). In the side naves, instead of the ruined frescoes, artist Tymon Niesiołowski painted St. Francis, St. Theresa, The Crucified, and St. Catherine. In 1971–1973, the wall paintings in the interior of the church were restored by a group of specialists from Poland.

In addition to the wall paintings, the church spaces are decorated with oil paintings depicting saints and biblical scenes and framed in luxurious Baroque frames. Of the ten valuable canvases, four are attributed to the artist Kanuty Rusiecki. Among Rusiecki's most famous works are the decorative painting Mary with the Baby and St. Casimir, as well as St. Peter and St. John.

The accents of the church space – the pulpit and the organ choir – complete the unified Rococo style interior ensemble. The pulpit is attached to the first pillar on the eastern side, located closest to the chancel. It consists of a graceful tribune and a canopy (roof) raised above it. The structure is made of wood, richly decorated with gilded tin, stylized cartouches and plaster sculptures; the top of the canopy is crowned with a symbolic figure, emphasizing the importance of the sermon. Nearby, on the right wall of the presbytery, a memorial plaque is built in to commemorate the completion of the construction of the sanctuary and its solemn consecration.

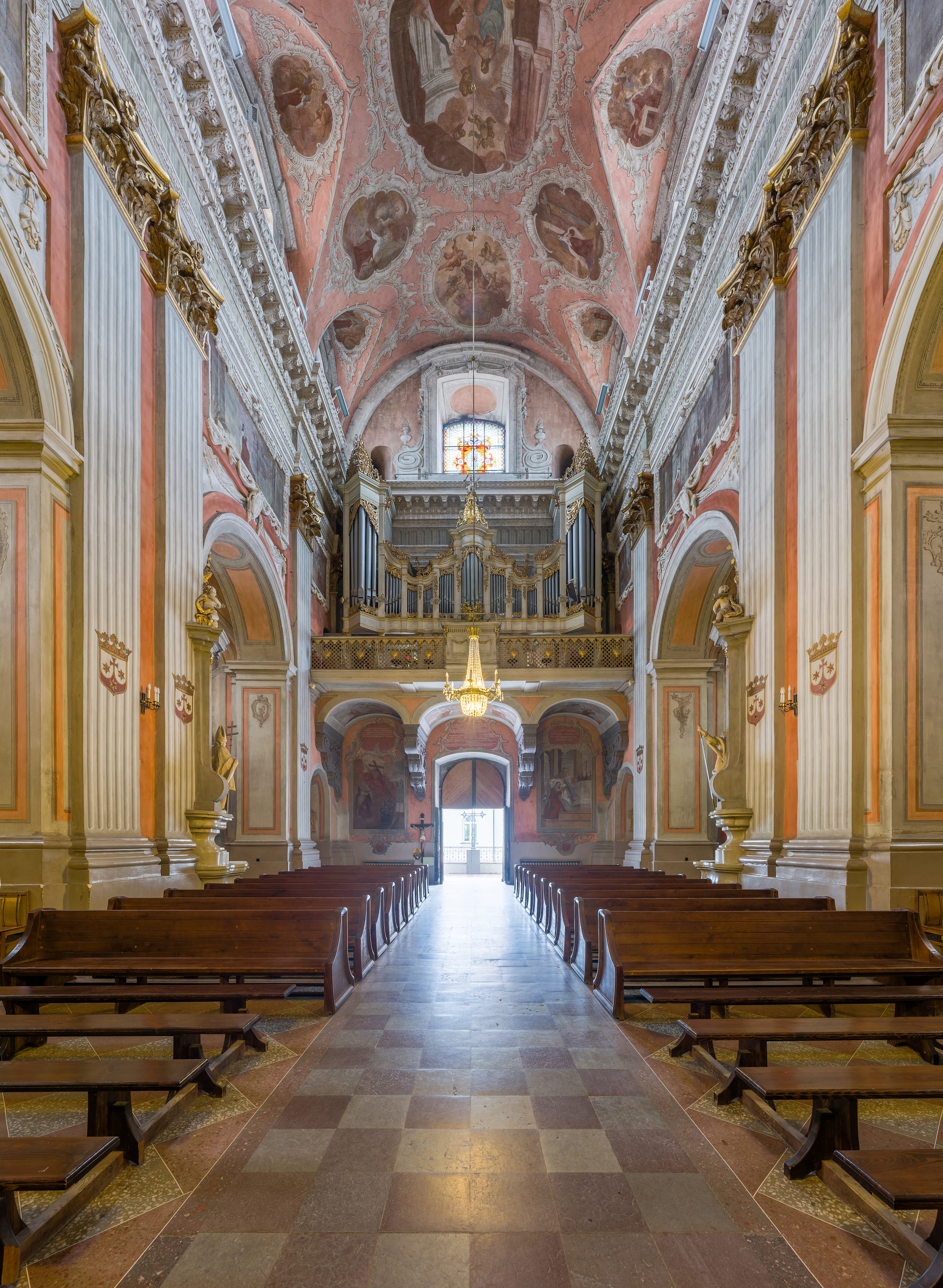
Interior of the church, looking towards the main entrance and organ

Above the main entrance is a spacious organ choir, supported by a massive brick structure supported by arches. The center of the choir is dominated by the organ prospectus, created in the neo-Baroque style. Although the current instrument is later than the church decor itself, it harmoniously blends into the unified artistic whole of the sanctuary. The wooden organ body is characterized by extremely meticulous decoration: it is decorated with fine gilded carvings, stylized plant motifs and a playful, dynamic sculpture of an angel, which visually connects the organ with the characters of the vaulted frescoes. The organ mechanism is characterized by good acoustic dispersion, which is ensured by the high central nave. The instrument has 18 registers, arranged across two manual keyboards and pedals, which allows for the performance of both polyphonic works characteristic of the Baroque era and later sacred music. The choir space was also used as a tribune for singers, the balustrade of which is decorated as luxuriously as the other interior elements, maintaining the characteristic lightness and grace of Rococo.

Massive, artistic Empire style chandeliers hang in the main nave. They are made of darkened metal structures, richly decorated with clear crystal details that refract light and give the space additional radiance. These lamps bring classicist harmony to the dominant Baroque and Rococo interior.

The church pews were made at the end of the 18th century, arranged in two rows in the central nave, connected into sections. They are decorated with intarsia: the front panels feature two coats of arms, the rear panels feature plant motifs, and the side supports feature a linear ornament repeating a wavy silhouette.

One of the most important highlights of the church interior is the dome, whose vault compositions represent the scenes of the death and apotheosis of St. Theresa. One part depicts the saint's death, completing the cycle of her mystical love and martyrdom. This composition was created based on a carving by Arnold van Westerhout: at the bottom of the vault St. Theresa is depicted with a cross, surrounded by monks and relatives, and in the upper part, on the clouds, Christ and the heavenly host are painted. The symbol of the Holy Spirit, a dove, is embedded in the stream of light between them; this image directly illustrates the inscription on the carving, which explains that the saint's soul, full of divine love, flew away in the form of a dove at the moment of death. The other side of the dome depicts the apotheosis of St. Theresa – the saint supported by angels, soaring against the background of clouds. This composition is also based on the biographical illustration by Arnold van Westerhout and reflects the plot of the saint's mystical ascension, soul and body, into the company of heavenly inhabitants.

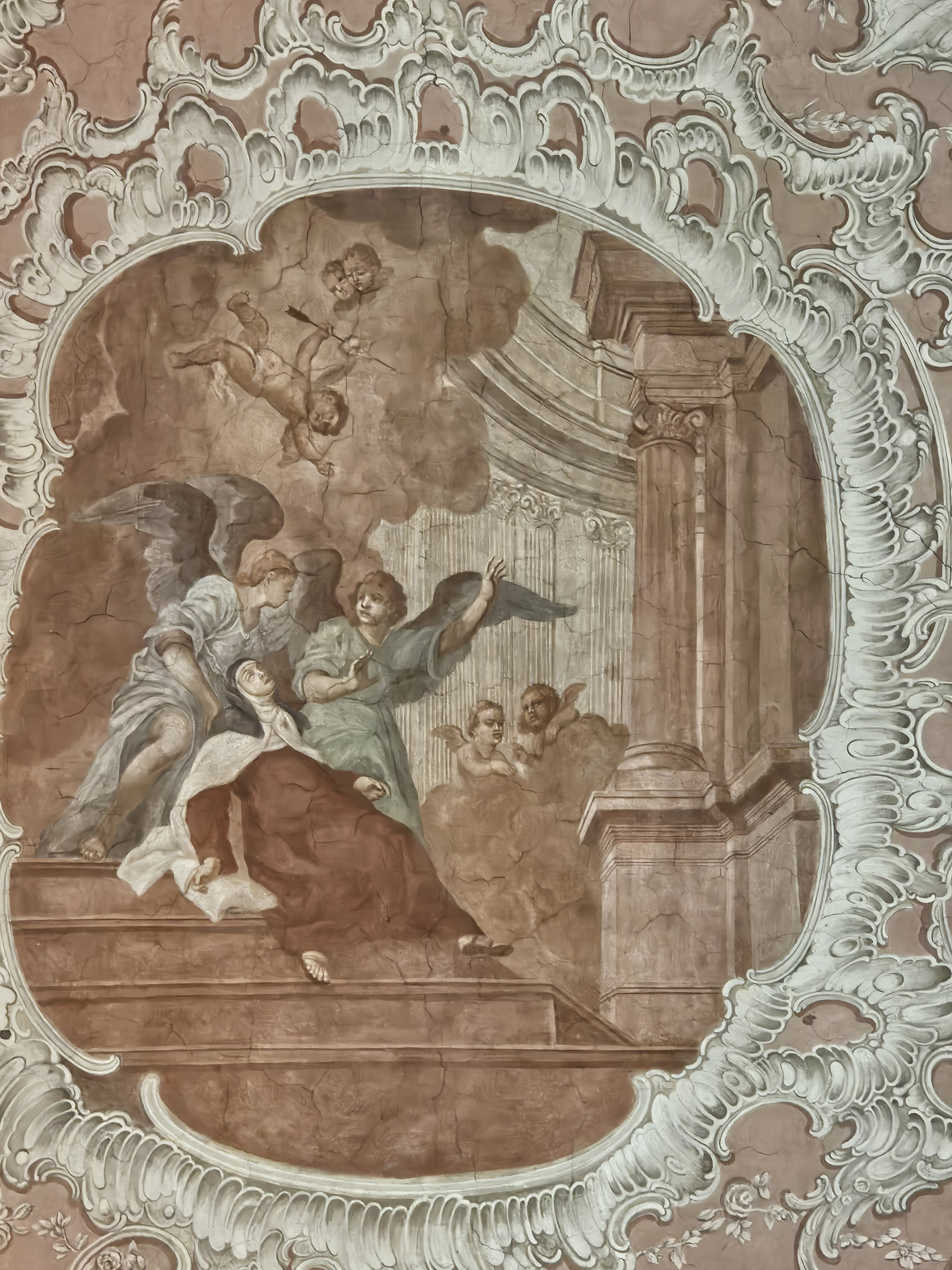
This vault fresco captures one of the most important scenes from the life of St. Theresa – The Ecstasy of Prayer of St. Theresa.

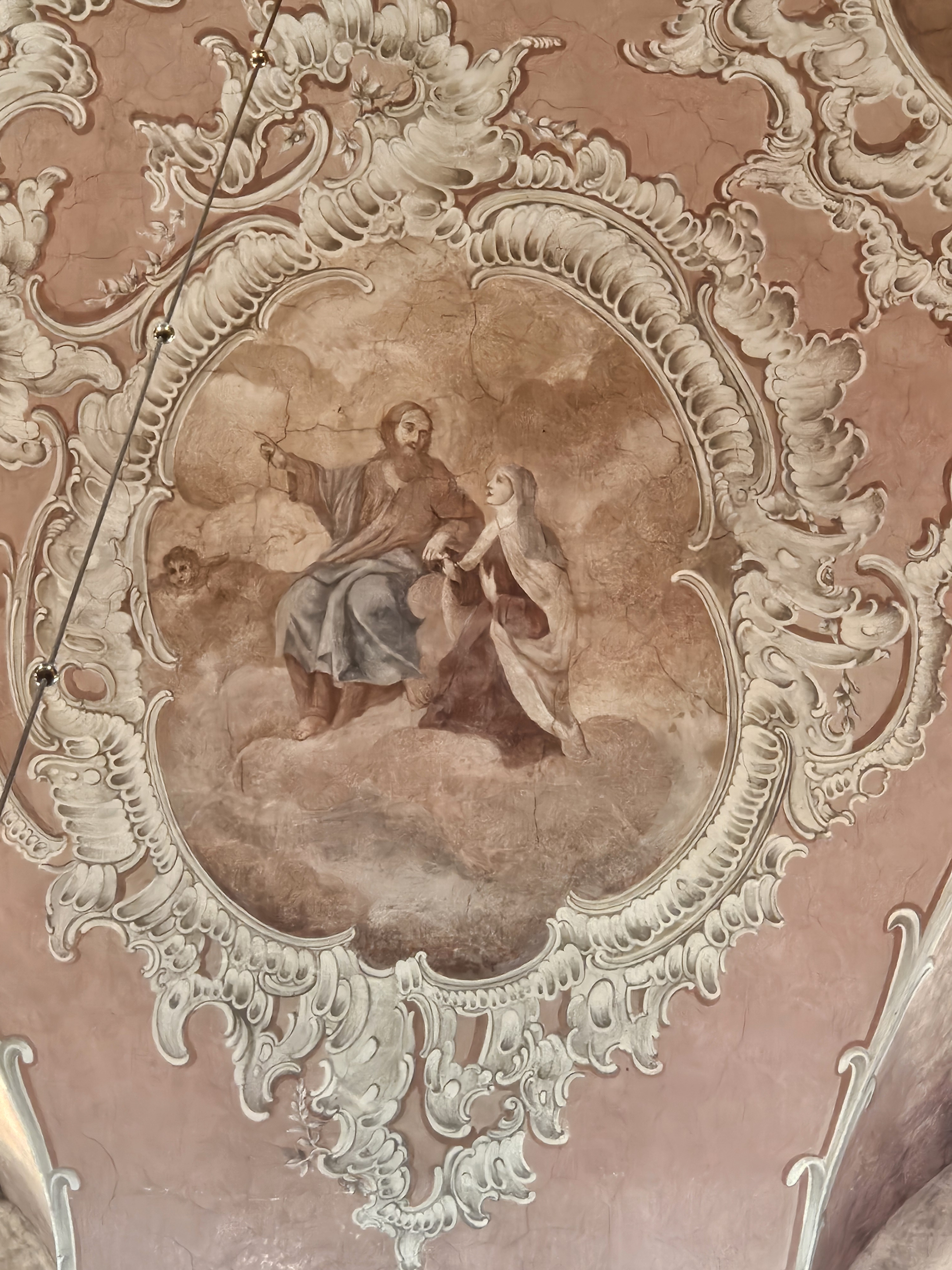
A vaulted fresco depicting the scene Christ Explaining the Truths of Faith to St. Theresa.

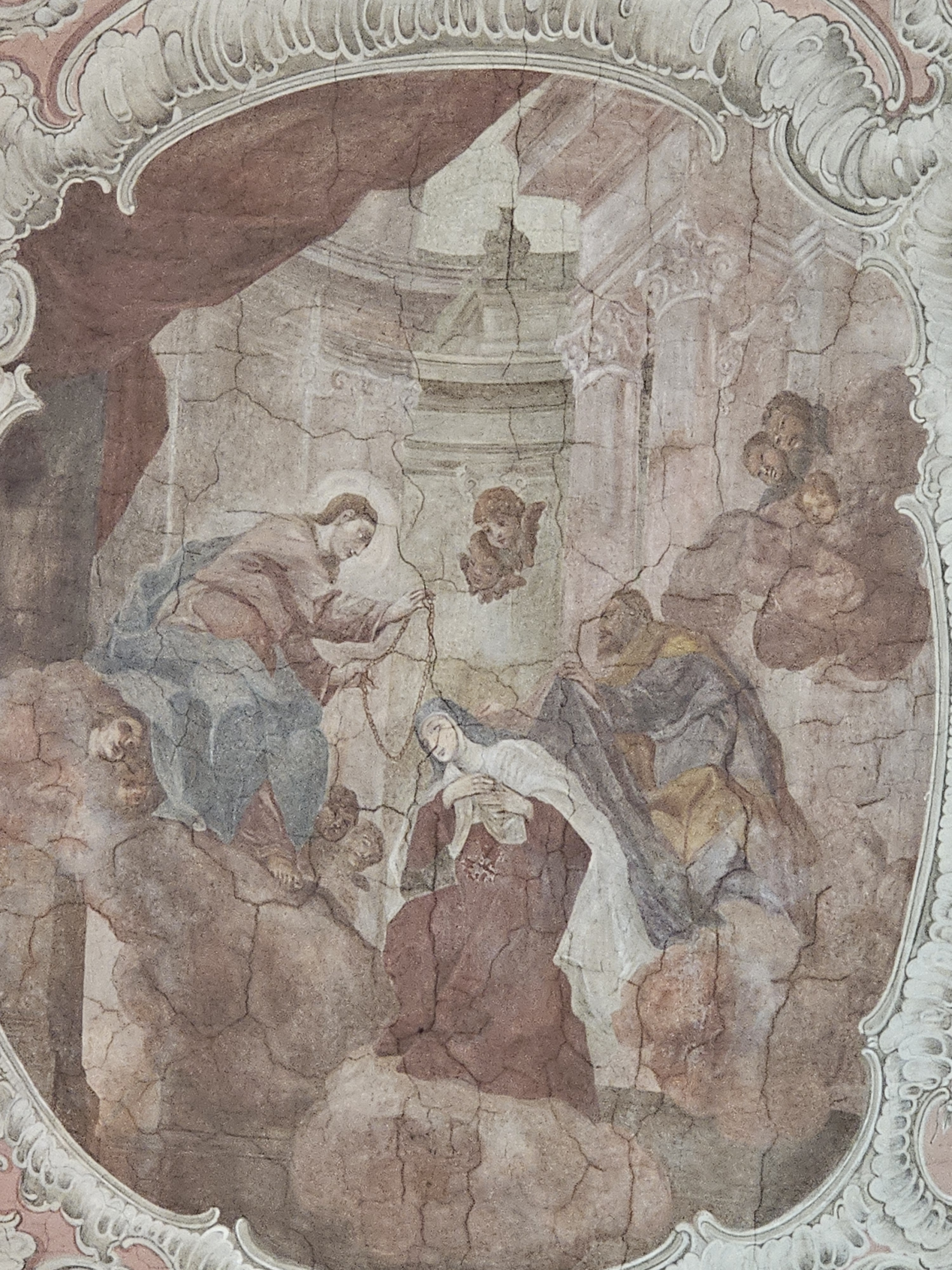
A vaulted fresco depicting the scene Christ hanging the rosary around the neck of St. Theresa.

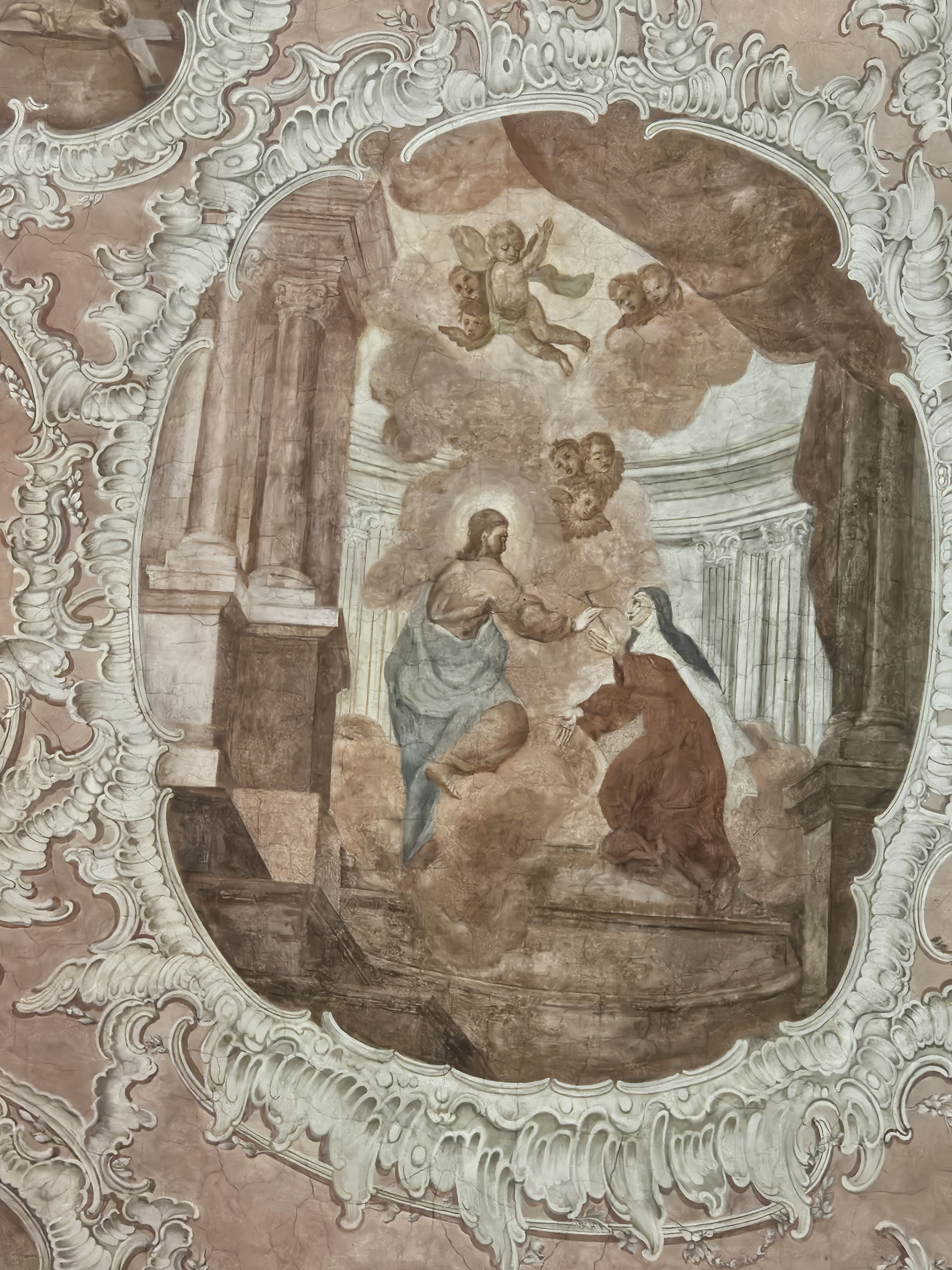
One of eighteen scenes from the life of St. Theresa located in the vaults of the main nave of the church.

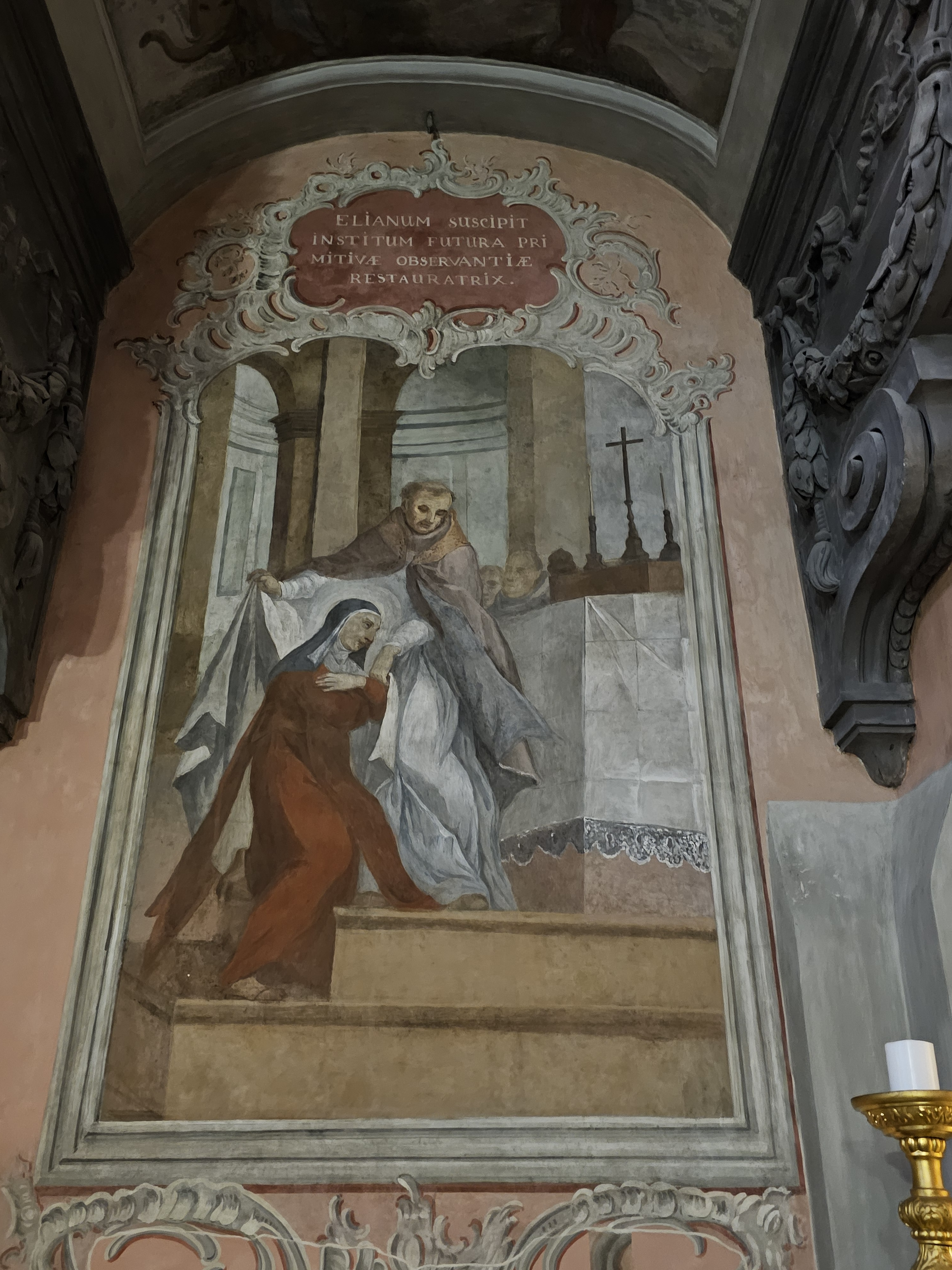
Fresco with one of the scenes from the life of St. Theresa.

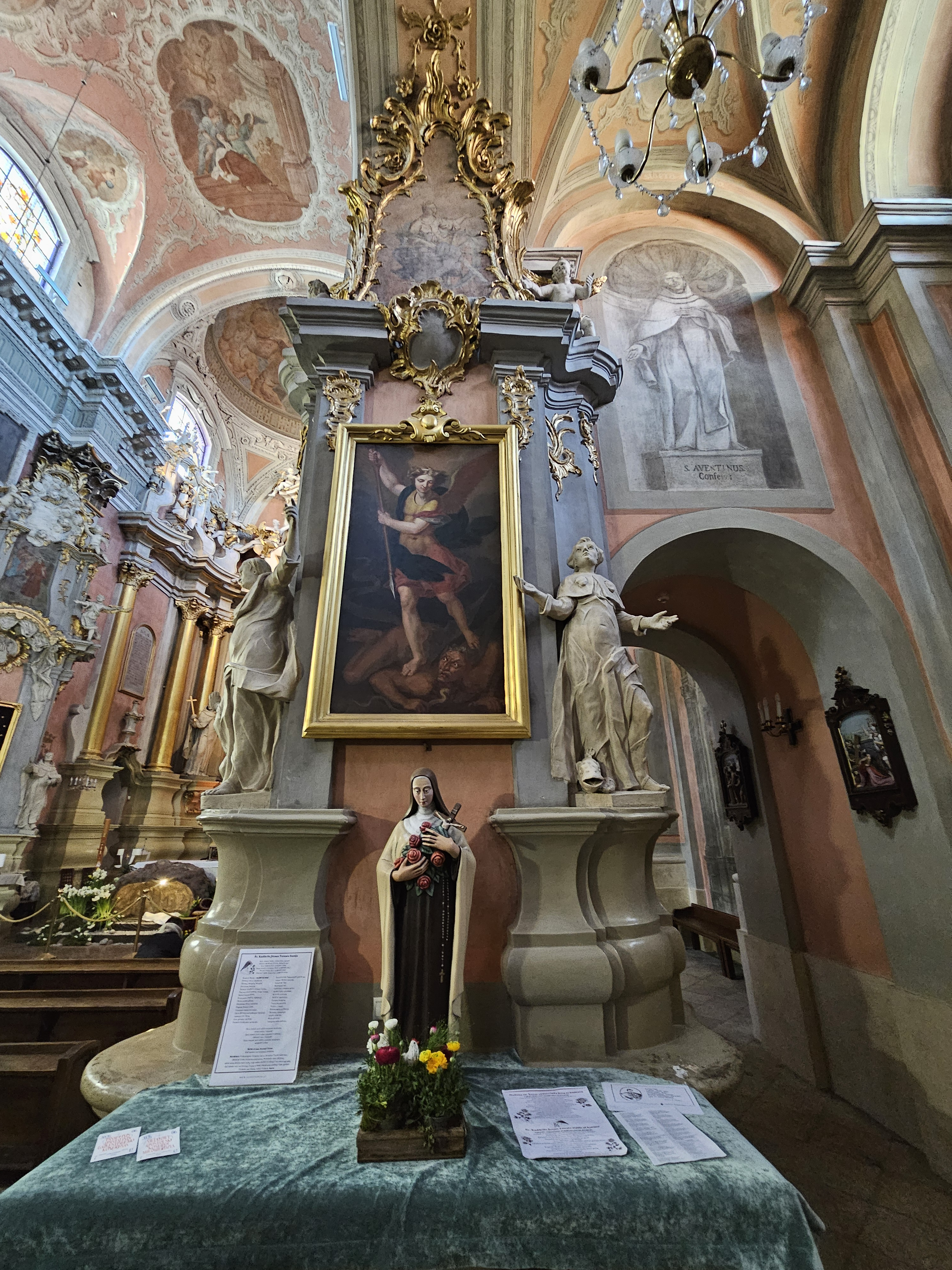
Side altar of St. Michael the Archangel

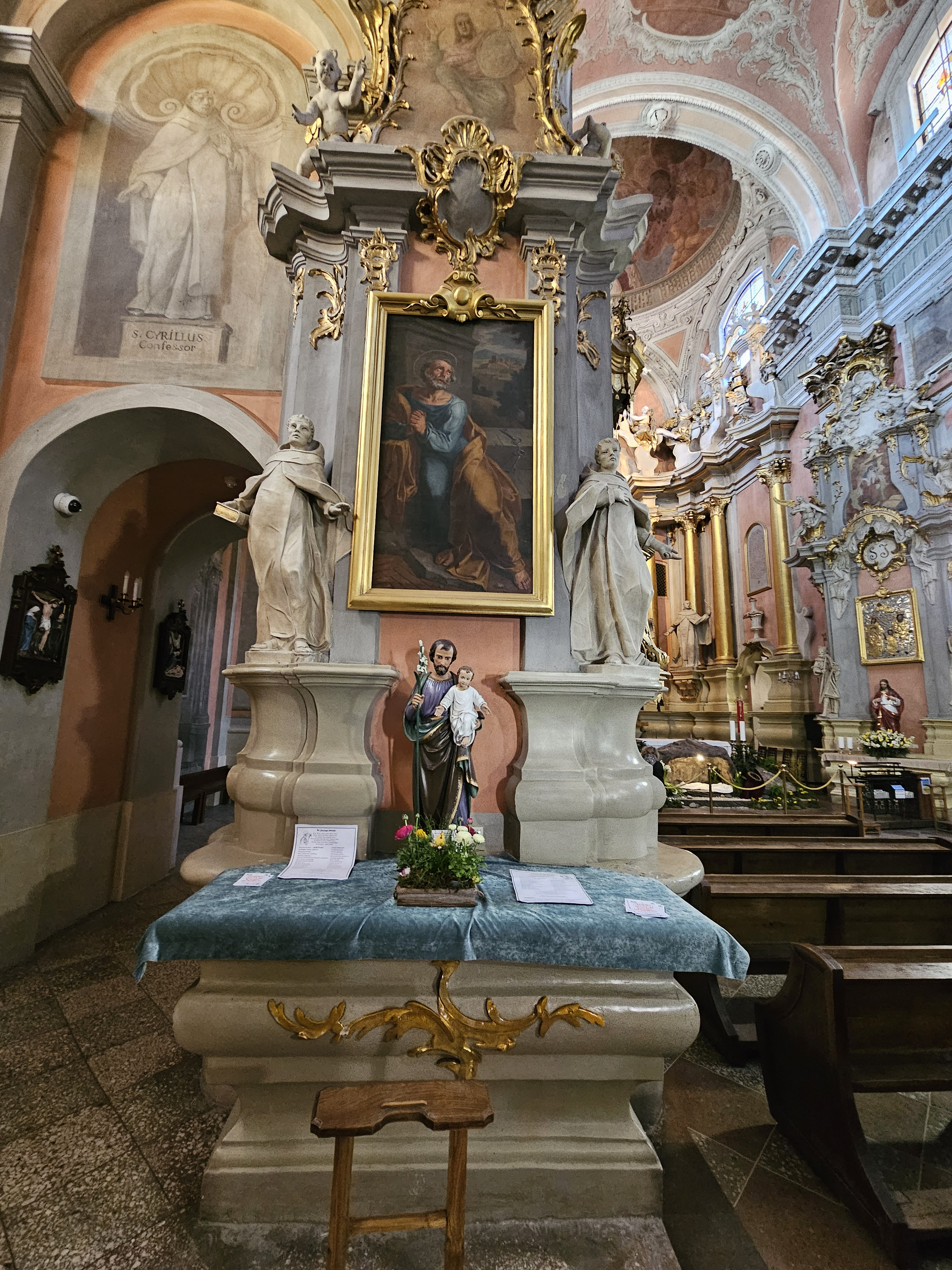
Side altar of St. Joseph

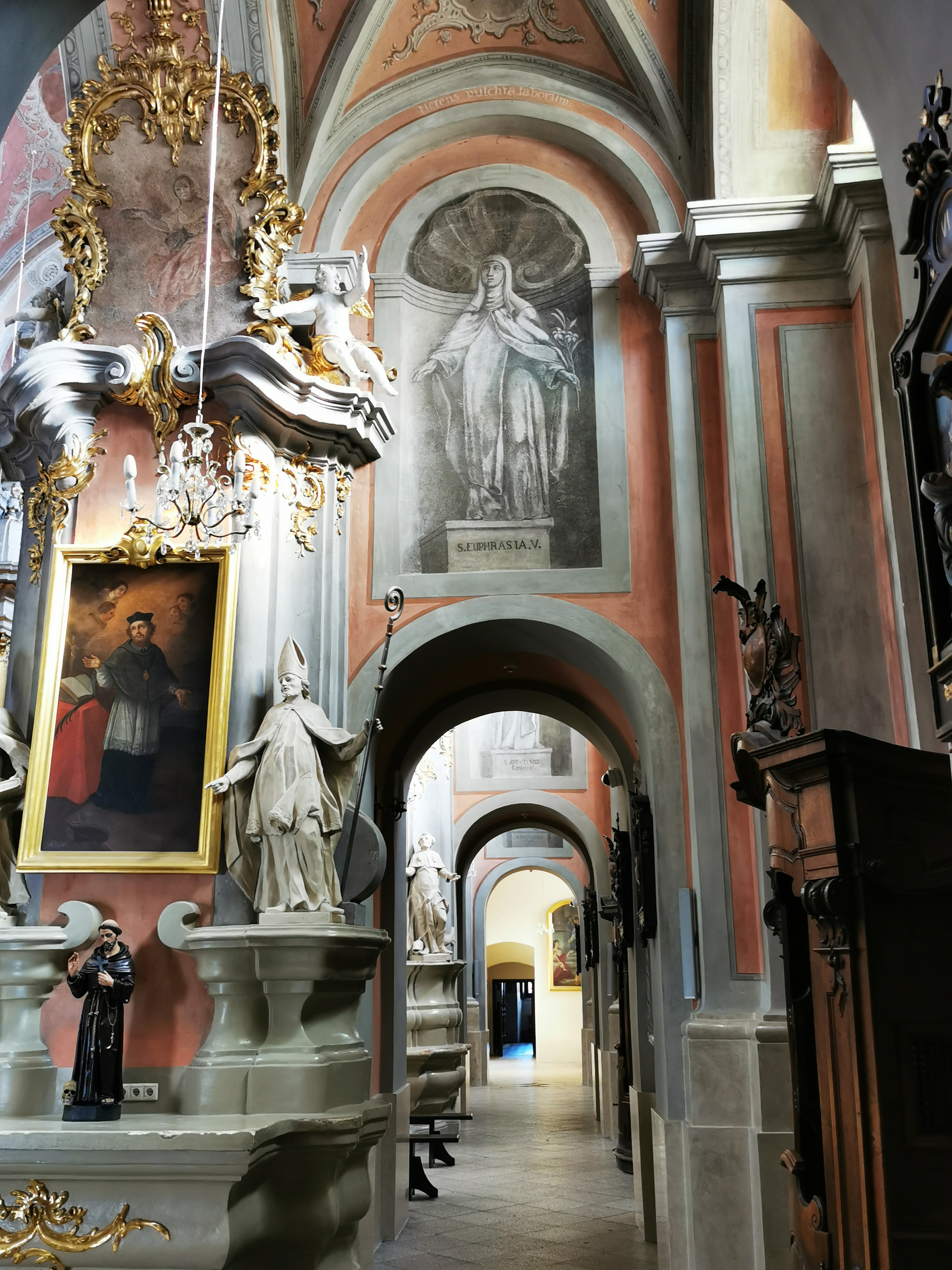
Right aisle

==== Pociej Chapel ====
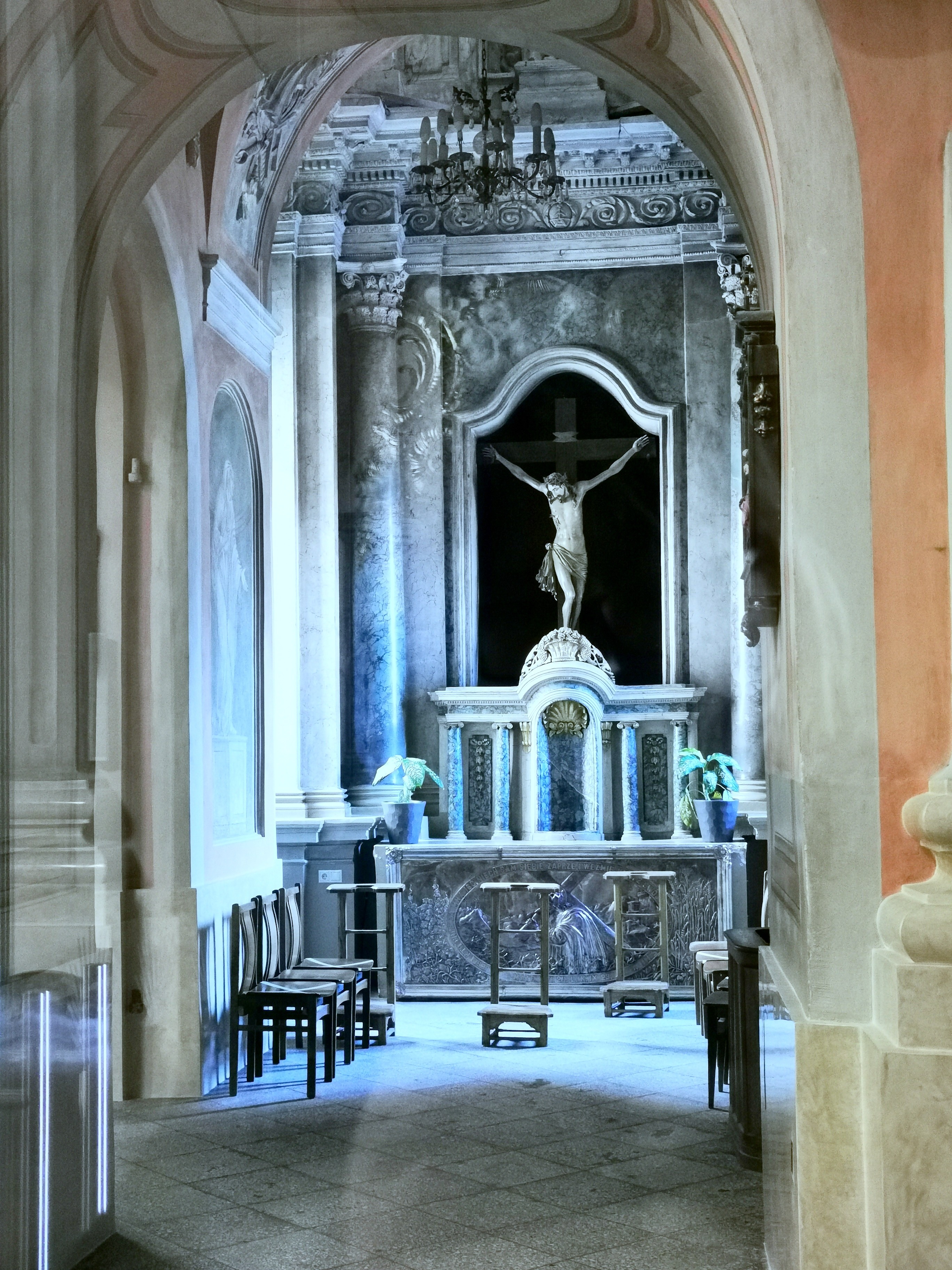
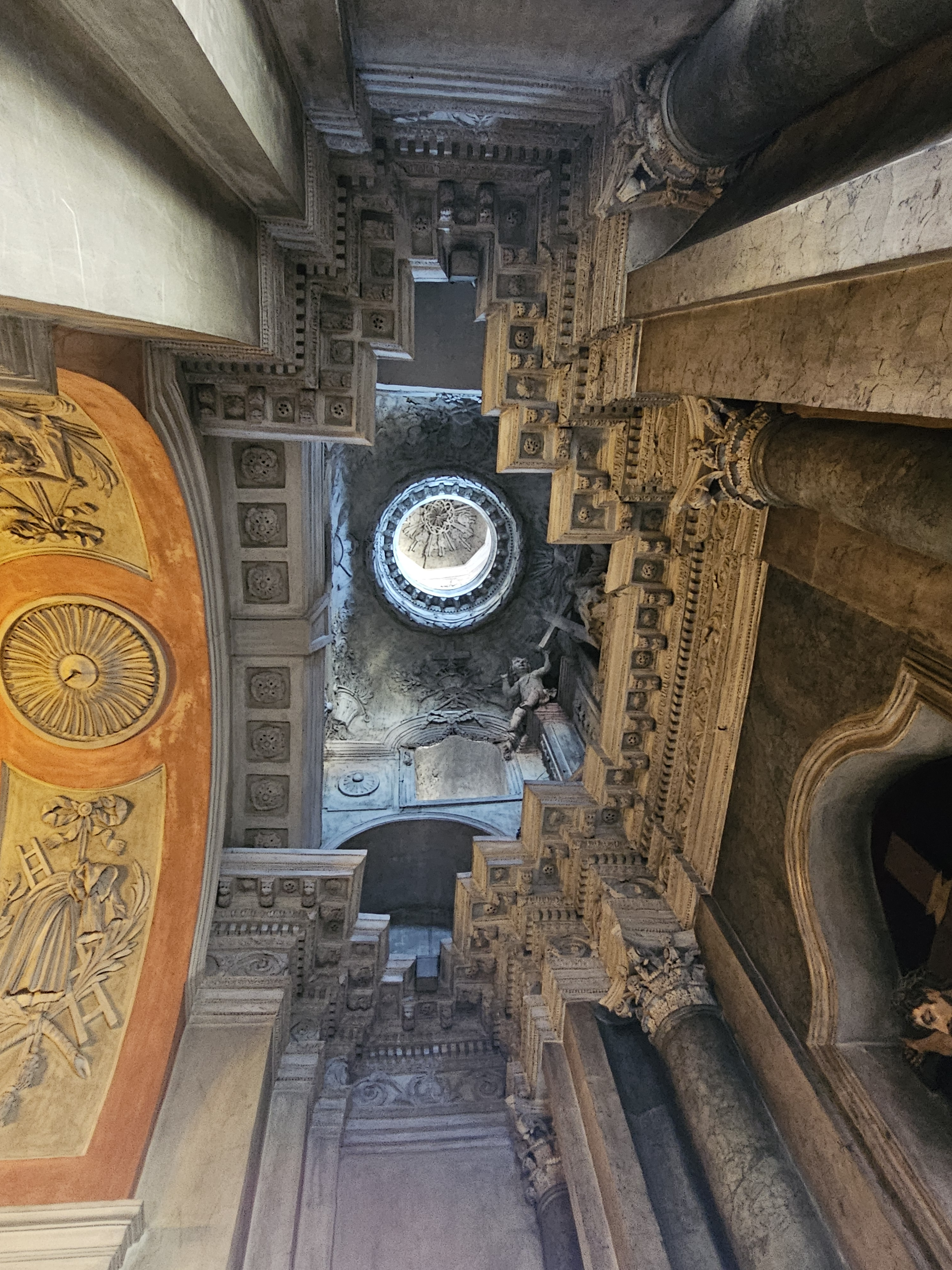
Altar (left) and dome (right) of the Pociejai Chapel.

The Pociej Chapel is a late Baroque architectural monument located on the right (when viewed from the main entrance) side of the church. The chapel was built in 1783 as a family mausoleum at the expense of Michał Pociej, starosta of Rahachow.

The chapel is characterized by the features of the mature and late Baroque, which are visually different from the early Baroque main body of the church. The building has an almost square plan, rising above the level of the roof of the side nave. It is crowned by a graceful, massive dome with a hexagonal lantern, finished with an iron cross. The walls of the façade are divided by pilasters and decorated with modest but plastic cornices, typical of the architecture of the late 18th century.

The single-tiered altar of the Pociej Chapel, made of gray artificial marble, clings to the northern (external) wall. The main axis of the chapel's decoration is the story of the Passion of Jesus and the discovery of the Holy Cross. The artistic composition depicts saint Helena, mother of Constantine I, with a cross and angels holding an anchor and the Host – symbols of fidelity and sacrifice. The flaming heart above the figure of St. Helena harmoniously blends into the overall symbolic program of the sanctuary. In the center of the altar, the figure of the Crucified, received from Lublin in 1764, is venerated, which was praised in his sermons by the preacher of the Discalced Carmelites of Vilnius, theology lecturer Michał Franciszek Karpowicz.

The antependium of the Pociej Chapel is neoclassical. In the middle is depicted Jesus carrying the cross, on the side planes – bells and grapes, while the forms of the forged decoration are rich.

==== Chapel of the Blessed Virgin Mary ====
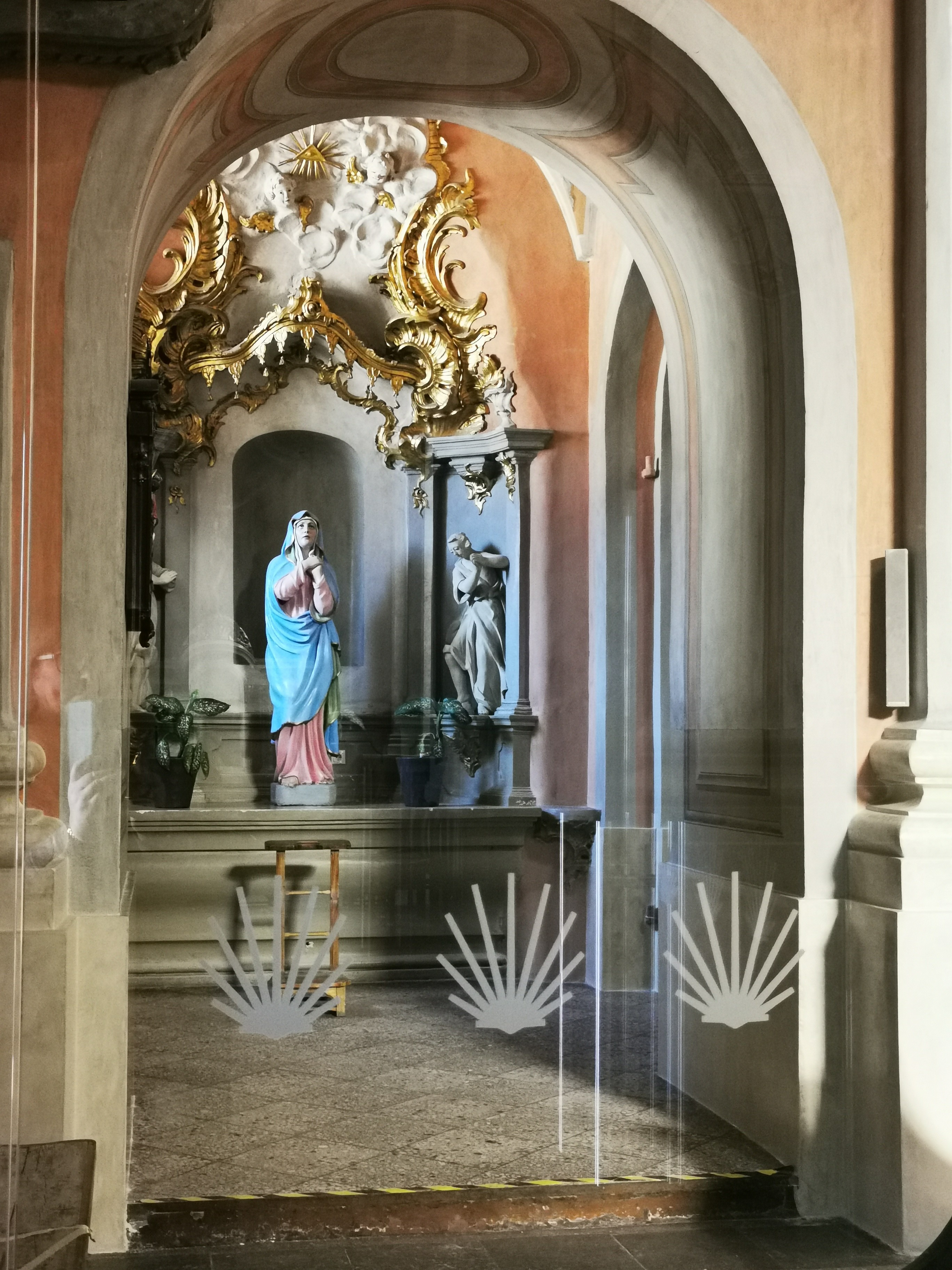
Chapel of the Blessed Virgin Mary

Opposite the Pociej Chapel, on the left (northern) side of the church, there is a small symmetrically arranged chapel of Mary, mother of Jesus, which, together with the Pociej Mausoleum, forms a single ensemble of lateral spaces. This space is characterized by a very solid Baroque decor, and its vault is decorated with a rare fresco with the motif of the Passion Child. This composition depicts the Christ Child, surrounded by symbols of future suffering (crown of thorns, nails, cross), which is a typical manifestation of the spirituality of the Discalced Carmelites, emphasizing the humanity of Jesus and the inevitability of his sacrifice from childhood.

In the center of the chapel stands a beautiful, single-tiered Rococo altar, whose architectural forms are characterized by dynamic undulation and grace. The altar retable is decorated with two expressive sculptures of unknown saints (probably representatives of the Carmelites Order), the drapery plasticity of which is characteristic of the late Vilnian Baroque. The upper part of the altar is crowned with a relief glory, in the background of whose rays is embedded the emblem of Divine Providence (an eye in a triangle), symbolizing heavenly protection. Although the altar is sometimes attributed to the later neo-Baroque, its artistic expression and gilded wood carvings masterfully reproduce the stylistics of the mid-18th century, maintaining the artistic coherence of the entire sanctuary.

== See also ==
- List of churches in Vilnius
- Catholic Church in Lithuania
