= Subačius Gate =

Coordinates: 54°40′35″N 25°17′31″E

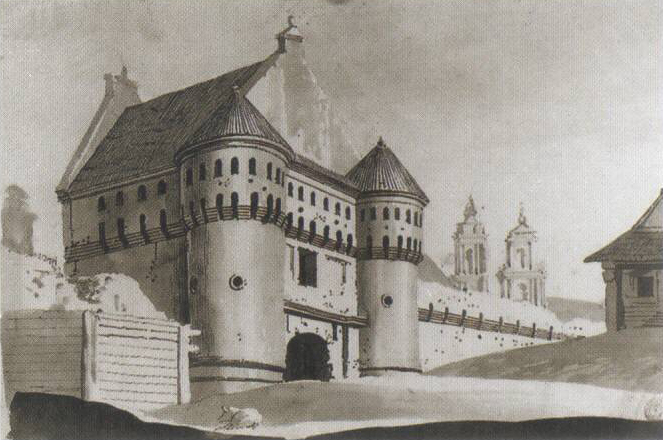
Subačius Gate at the end of 18th century

Subačius Gate was arguably one of the most important gates in the city of Vilnius, leading strategic way to Vitebsk, Polock, Smolensk and Moscow. The gate was first mentioned in 1528 and reconstructed in the 17th century, forming a seamless defensive line in the southeast of Vilnius. It was noted for tremendous fortification as it not only had upper firing shells but also machicolations.

The gate was demolished on May 27, 1801 under Russian magistrate command. Some gate bricks were used for barracks furnaces and merchants palace reconstruction. Only small amount of gate foundations have remained until nowadays.
