= Wall of Vilnius =

Historic wall built around the city of Vilnius, Lithuania

Coordinates: 54.674265°N 25.28955°E

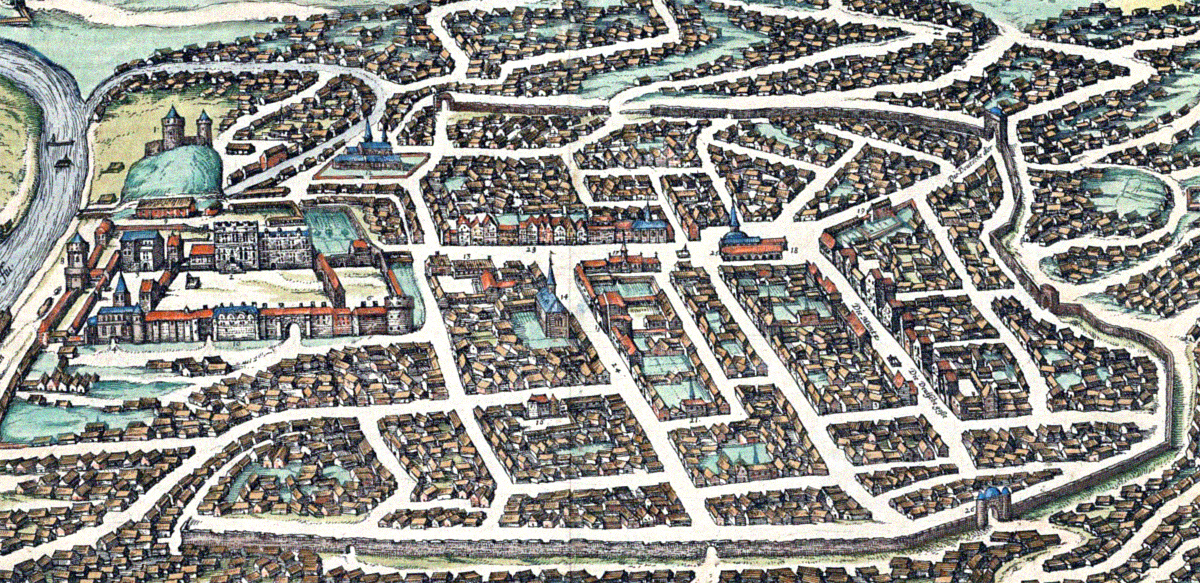
Vilnius city wall in the 16th century

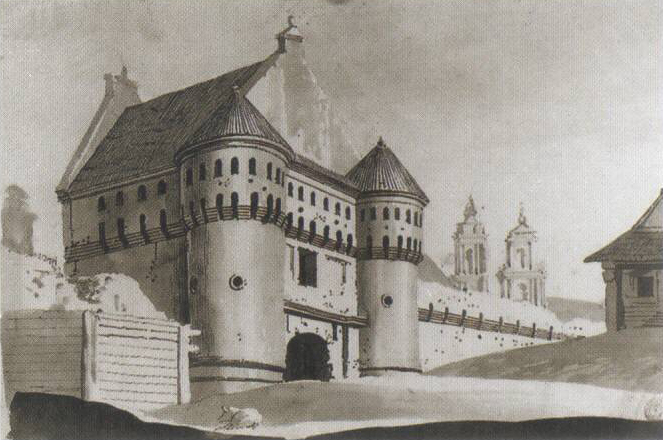
Subačius Gate in the 18th century

The Vilnius city wall (Lithuanian: Vilniaus miesto gynybinė siena) was a defensive wall around Vilnius, capital city of the Grand Duchy of Lithuania. It was built between 1503 and 1522 for protection from the attacks by the Crimean Khanate at the beginning of the Muscovite–Lithuanian Wars. The stone and brick wall was a key element of the defensive system of Vilnius, and was paid for by the city's landowners. It contained nine gates and an artillery bastion. Some of the original constructions have survived.

- Wet Gate stood near Cathedral Square in Vilnius. Called also Mary Magdalene Gate.
- Tatar Gate stood at the corner of Liejykla and Totoriai street.
- Vilija (Vilnius) Gate stood at the corner of Vilnius and Bernardinai street.
- Trakai Gate was built at the corner of Trakai and Pylimas streets. It was the main gate of the city and contained (as did the Gate of Dawn) a chapel.
- Rūdininkai Gate stood at the end of the Rūdininkai street.
- Sharp Gate (Polish: Ostra brama) guarded the entrance to the southern part of the city. It is now known as the Gate of Dawn. The sometimes mentioned name "Medininkai Gate" is not directly attested in the sources.
- Subačius Gate was built at the end of what is now Holly Spirit street.
- Saviour's Gate (Polish: Spaska brama) was built near the Vilnia River in the eastern side of city.
- Bernardines Gate
- Castle Gate

An artillery bastion was built to protect the eastern side of the city. It is currently a museum of militaria from Vilnius and is under renovation.

Following the partitions of the Polish–Lithuanian Commonwealth, the Russian government ordered to tear down most of the wall and all the gates, except the Gate of Dawn. Some parts of the wall are still visible throughout the Old Town of Vilnius or are going to be restored and displayed.

== Bibliography ==
- Bednarczuk, Leszek (2010). "Nazwy Wilna i jego mieszkańców w dokumentach Wielkiego Księstwa Litewskiego (WKL)" [Linguistic picture of Wilno/Vilnius and its inhabitants in the documents of the Grand Duchy of Lithuania] (PDF). Annales Universitatis Paedagogicae Cracoviensis. Studia Linguistica. V.
- (in Lithuanian) Ragauskienė, R.; Antanavičius, D; Burba, D.; ir kt. Vilniaus žemutinė pilis XIV a. – XIX a. pradžioje: 2002–2004 m. istorinių šaltinių paieškos. Vilnius. 2006
