= Gate of Dawn =

City gate

- Aušros vartai (Lithuanian)
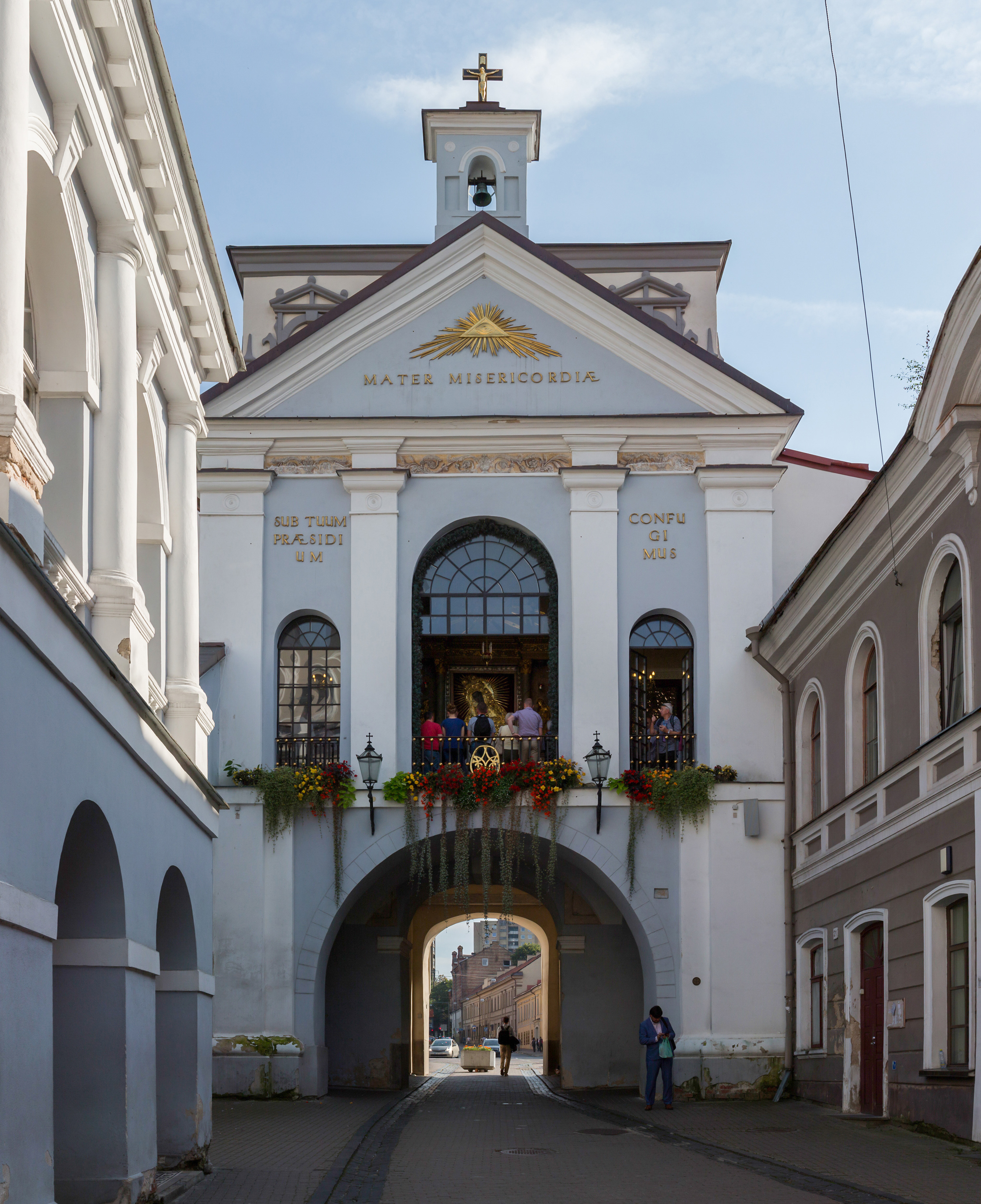
- The Gate of Dawn with the Chapel of Our Lady of the Gate of Dawn
- Alternative names: Sharp Gate

General information
- Location: Vilnius, Lithuania
- Coordinates: 54°40′28″N 25°17′22″E
- Year built: 1503–1514
- Groundbreaking: 1672 (wooden chapel) 1711–1712 (brick chapel)

UNESCO World Heritage Site
- Official name: Vilnius Old Town
- Type: Cultural
- Criteria: Cultural: (ii), (iv)
- Designated: 1994
- Reference no.: 541
- UNESCO region: Europe

Cultural Monuments of Lithuania
- Type: National
- Designated: 13 February 2008
- Reference no.: 27324

The Gate of Dawn (Lithuanian: Aušros vartai; Polish: Ostra brama) is a historic city gate and Catholic shrine in Vilnius, Lithuania. Built between 1503 and 1514 as part of the city's defensive fortifications, it is the only surviving gate of the former Vilnius city wall, which was largely demolished at the turn of the 19th century. Originally known as the Medininkai Gate and later as the Sharp Gate, it is one of the most recognizable historical landmarks of Vilnius.

The gate houses the Chapel of Our Lady of the Gate of Dawn, containing a 17th-century painting of the Virgin Mary, known as Our Lady of the Gate of Dawn or the Mother of Mercy, traditionally venerated as miraculous. The chapel was established by the Discalced Carmelites in the 17th century, rebuilt after a fire in 1711 and remodeled in the Neoclassical style in the early 19th century. The painting was canonically crowned in 1927. The shrine is an important Catholic pilgrimage destination and holds particular religious and cultural significance for both Lithuanians and Poles.

== History ==
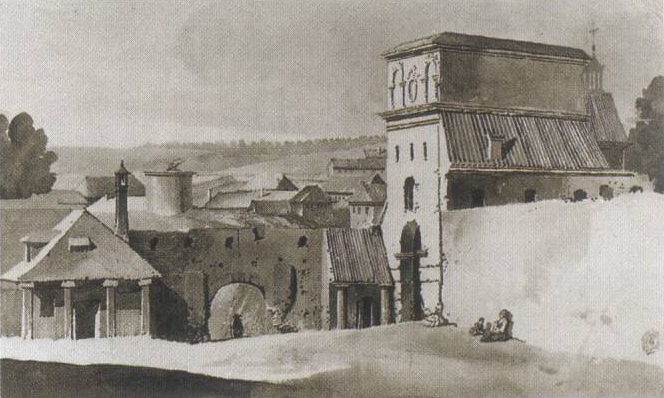
The gate in the late 18th century

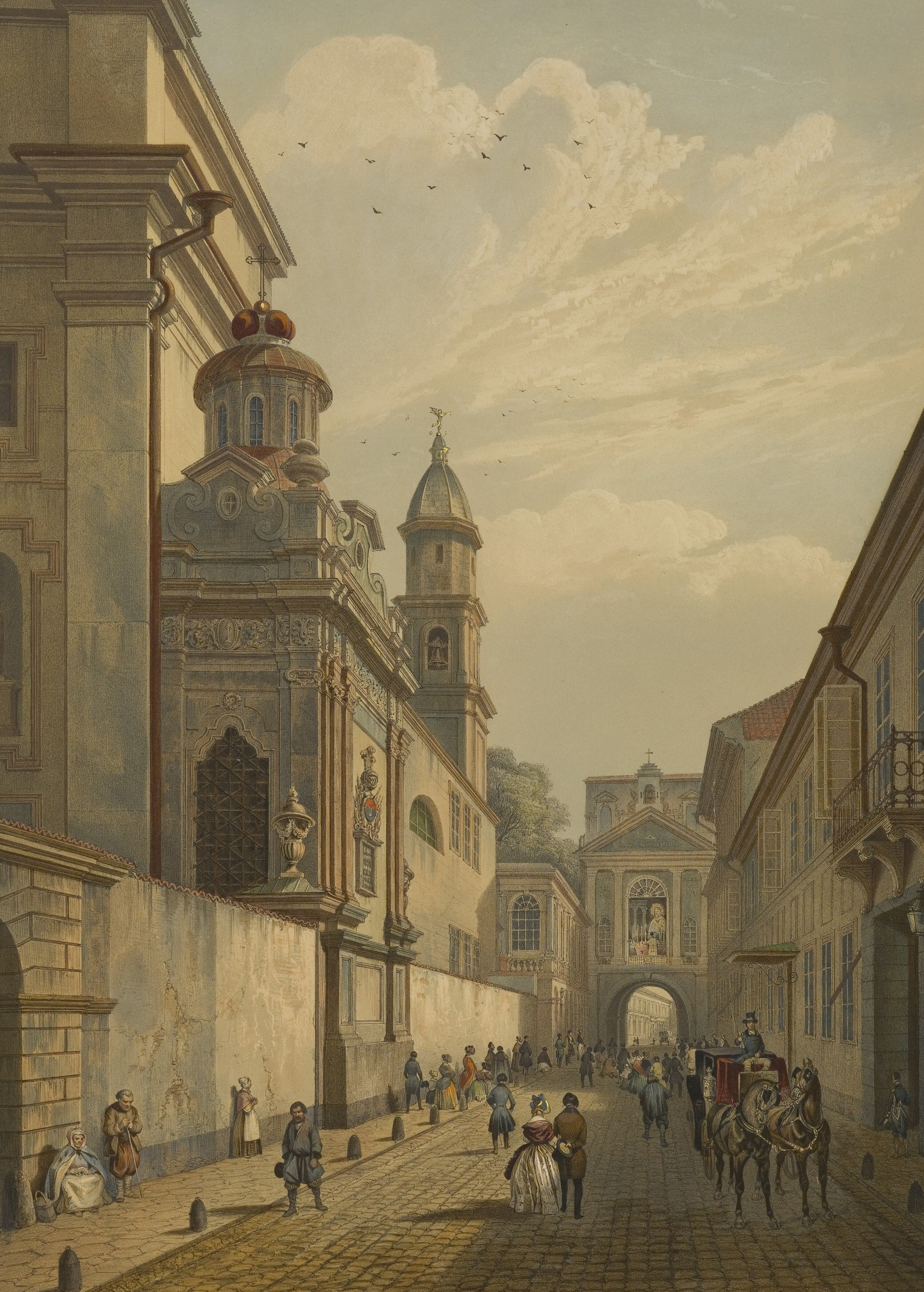
The gate between 1845–1875

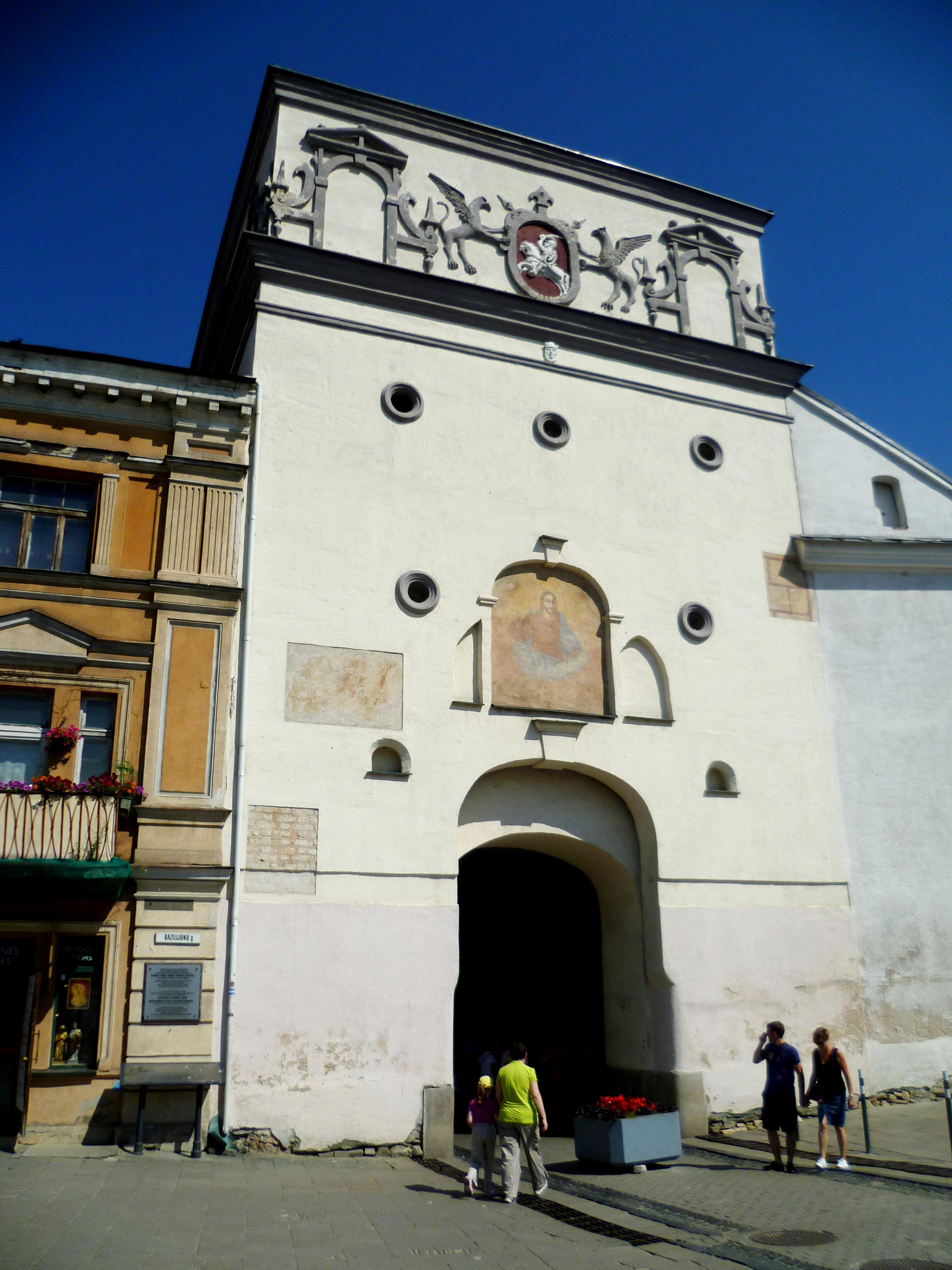
The southern side of the gate decorated with the coat of arms of Lithuania and Jesus in 2017

The gate was built between 1503 and 1514 as one of the nine gates of the Vilnius city wall. Its defensive function is indicated by the firing openings still visible on the outside of the gate. It has been known as the Medininkai Gate, as it led to the village Medininkai south of Vilnius, as well as Sharp Gate. Probably right after its construction, an image of the Blessed Virgin Mary was hung on the gate. In the first half of the 17th century, a new image of the Virgin Mary was placed on the southern side, revered with special devotion to this day, while on the outer side, an image of the Salvator Mundi was displayed. On both sides of the image of the Savior, figures of the patron saints of Lithuania and the Crown—St. Casimir and St. Stanislaus—were placed. The painted representations were still visible in the first half of the 19th century, but were later plastered over and forgotten. They were only rediscovered in 1976 by conservator Leszek Krzemiński.

In 1626, a Discalced Carmelite monastery with the Church of St. Theresa was established right next to the gate. The monks began venerating the image placed in the gate and promoting its devotion among the people. In 1668, they obtained permission from the city to build a wooden chapel within the gate. The construction was completed in 1672, at which time the image was solemnly rehung.

In 1711, the chapel was destroyed by fire, but the image was saved and transferred to the Church of St. Teresa. A new brick chapel was built, and around 1713–1715, the image was relocated there. The modestly rebuilt chapel remained without any richer decoration for a long time; it was only in the years 1785–87 that a stucco altar and the stucco decoration, preserved to this day, were made. Initially overshadowed by the veneration of Marian images from St. Michael’s Church in Vilnius and from Trakai, the cult of the image grew in popularity throughout the 18th century.

During the demolition of the city walls between 1799 and 1805, the image was already so highly venerated that the gate was the only structure left intact. Between 1828 and 1830, the chapel underwent reconstruction, and prior to that, a gallery with stairs had been added.

In 1828, an inscription in Polish was placed on the chapel: "Matko Miłosierdzia, pod Twoją obronę uciekamy się" (lit. 'Mother of Mercy, we take refuge under Your protection'). In 1844, the Russian government dissolved the Carmelite monastery, and the care of the chapel was taken over by secular clergy. The Feast of the Protection of Our Lady of the Gate of Dawn, celebrated in the second week of November, attracted large crowds, with its origins dating back to the early 18th century.

After the suppression of the January Uprising, the governor of Vilnius, Mikhail Muravyov, planned to close the chapel and transfer the image to the Orthodox Monastery of the Holy Spirit. Although the chapel was successfully defended, the inscription on the gate had to be changed from Polish to the Latin opening of the Sub tuum præsidium, and preaching from the chapel was banned. Sermons were only reinstated after the Edict of Tolerance in 1905. The Polish inscription was restored after World War I when Vilnius became part of Poland. In 1923, a bas-relief of the Polish eagle by Bolesław Bałzukiewicz was placed in the niche on the southern side. Through the efforts of the Archbishop of Vilnius, Romuald Jałbrzykowski, the image was granted a canonical coronation in 1927.

Between 1931 and 1932, the chapel underwent renovations, including the removal of the organ and the covering of the walls with oak paneling.

In 2026, renovation works of the exterior were carried out which restored original initial colors and renewed frescoes and moldings.

== Our Lady of the Gate of Dawn ==
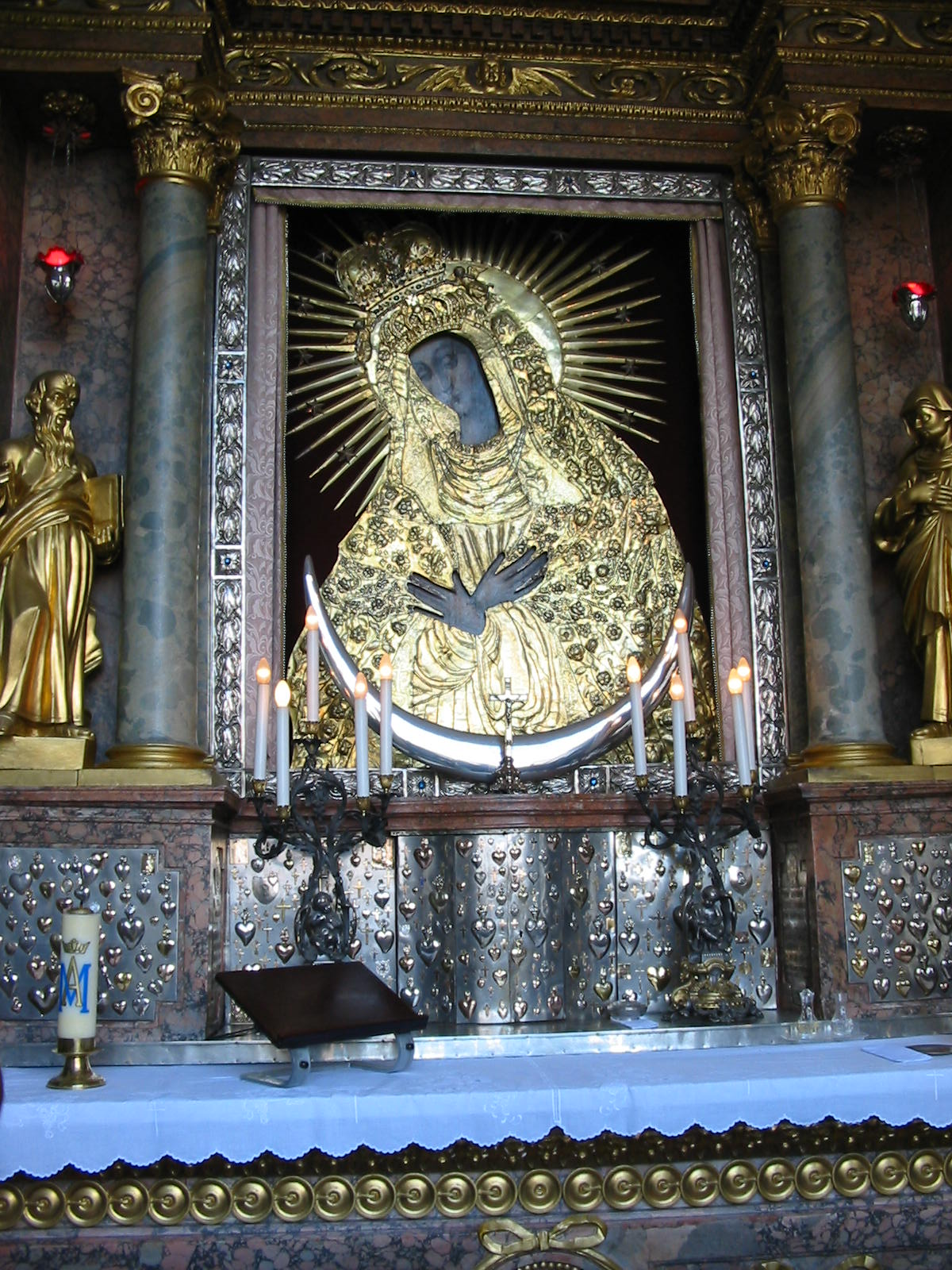
The icon of Our Lady of the Gate of Dawn

In the 16th century city gates often contained religious artifacts intended to guard the city from attacks and to bless travelers. The Chapel in the Gate of Dawn contains an icon of The Blessed Virgin Mary, Mother of Mercy, said to have miraculous powers. For centuries the picture has been one of the symbols of the city and an object of veneration for the Christian inhabitants of the city of all denominations. Thousands of votive offerings adorn the walls and many pilgrims from neighboring countries come to pray in front of the beloved painting. Masses are held in Lithuanian and Polish languages.

Historical study of the Gate of Dawn in Vilnius recalls the story of Oboźny of the Grand Duchy of Lithuania Antoni Nowosielski as the defender of the Gate of Dawn and the commander of the troops of the Grand Duchy of Lithuania during the expansion of the Swedish state and the attack on the city by the Swedish army during the Great Northern War. The Battle of Vilnius took place on 16 April 1702 prince Antoni Nowosielski commanded the forces of the Grand Duchy and defended the fortification with a chapel and a painting icon located in the Gate of Dawn complex. Many Swedish soldiers died in this battle, and none of the Polish and Lithuanians was injured. However, during the battle the Swedish bullet hit the picture itself. Then, the defender of the Vilnius castle prince Antoni Nowosielski, offered a silver votive. As a sign of gratitude for the victory, prince Antoni Nowosielski hung a silver plaque with the image and appropriate inscription next to the painting. Eventually, after this event, the cult of the holy image and the Gate of Dawn was popularized by the faithful, and the place itself became a national symbol.

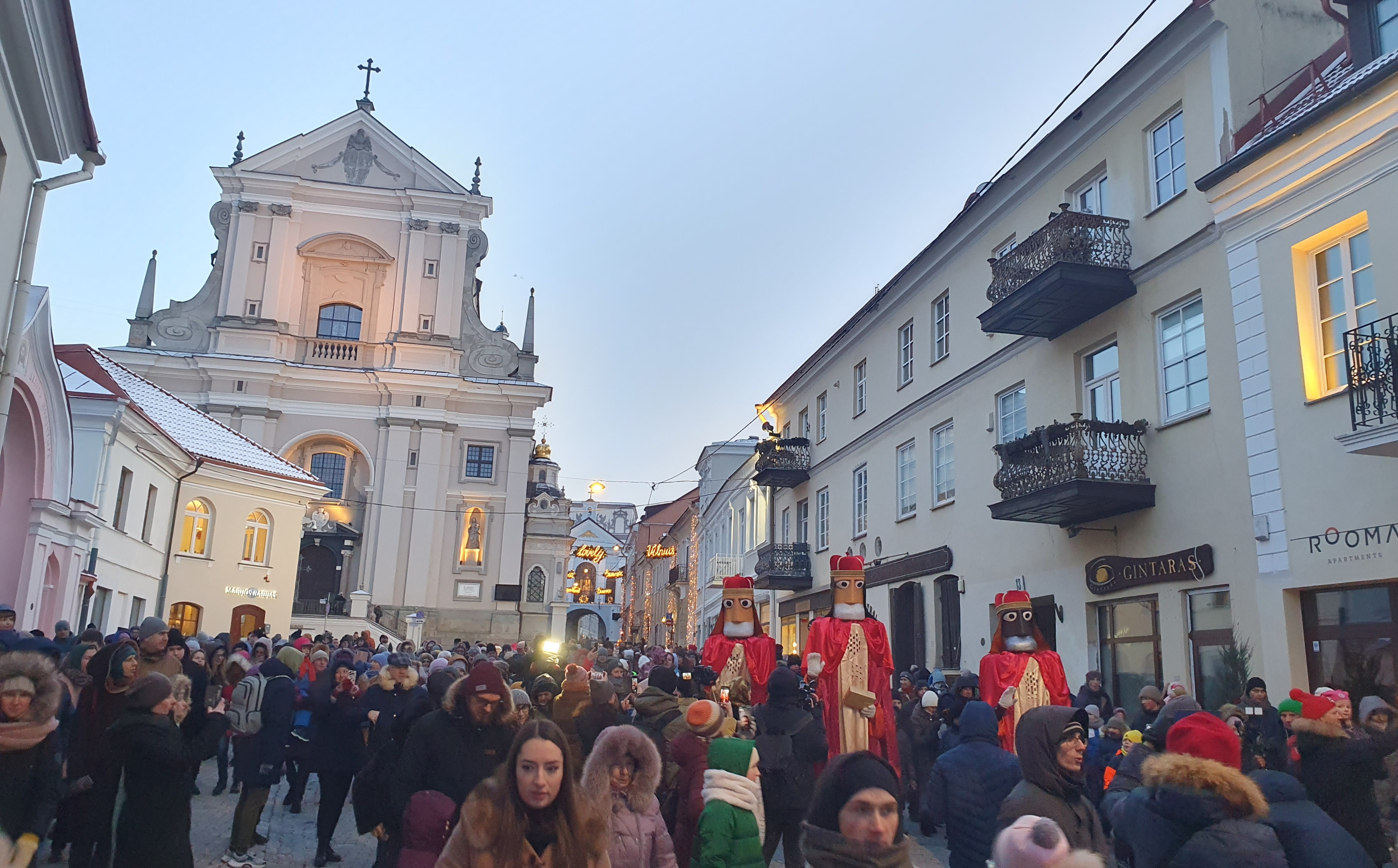
Three Kings' Day procession near the Church of St. Theresa and Gate of Dawn

After World War II the cult of Our Lady of the Gate of Dawn prevailed in Lithuanian and Polish communities worldwide and is continued in many shrines to the Virgin Mary in Europe, and the Americas. The largest of the churches devoted to Our Lady of the Gate of Dawn is St. Mary's Church in Gdańsk, Poland.

The shrine is also important in the development of the Divine Mercy devotion as it is the first place where the Divine Mercy image was exposed and also where the first celebration of the Divine Mercy Sunday took place.

On 4 September 1993 Pope John Paul II prayed the rosary at the Gate of Dawn Chapel. During the 2018 visit by Pope Francis to the Baltic states Pope Francis also prayed at the Gate of Dawn Chapel.

Church festival of the Blessed Virgin, Mary Mother of Mercy,—celebrated in the third week of November—is of great importance in the Vilnius Archdiocese and is celebrated since 1735.

== Lithuanian Chapel in St. Peter's Basilica in Vatican City ==
There is a Lithuanian Chapel of Our Lady Mater Misericordiae (Italian: Cappella Lituana, "Lithuanian Chapel") in St. Peter's Basilica in Vatican City. It was consecrated by the Pope Paul VI in 1970 and it is the place where Pope John Paul II first prayed after being elected Pope in 1978. Only Lithuania, Poland, Hungary and Ireland have such chapels in St. Peter's Basilica.

== Bibliography ==
- Kałamajska-Saeed, Maria (1990). Ostra Brama w Wilnie [Sharp Gate in Vilnius] (in Polish). Warsaw.
- Krachel, Tadeusz (2014). "Z dziejów kultu Matki Boskiej Ostrobramskiej" [From the History of the Cult of Our Lady of the Sharp Gate]. Diecezja wileńska. Studia i szkice (in Polish). Białystok.
