= Church of the Holy Trinity, Hlybokaye =

Catholic church in Hlybokaye, Belarus

- The Church of the Holy Trinity
- Касцёл Найсвяцейшай Тройцы
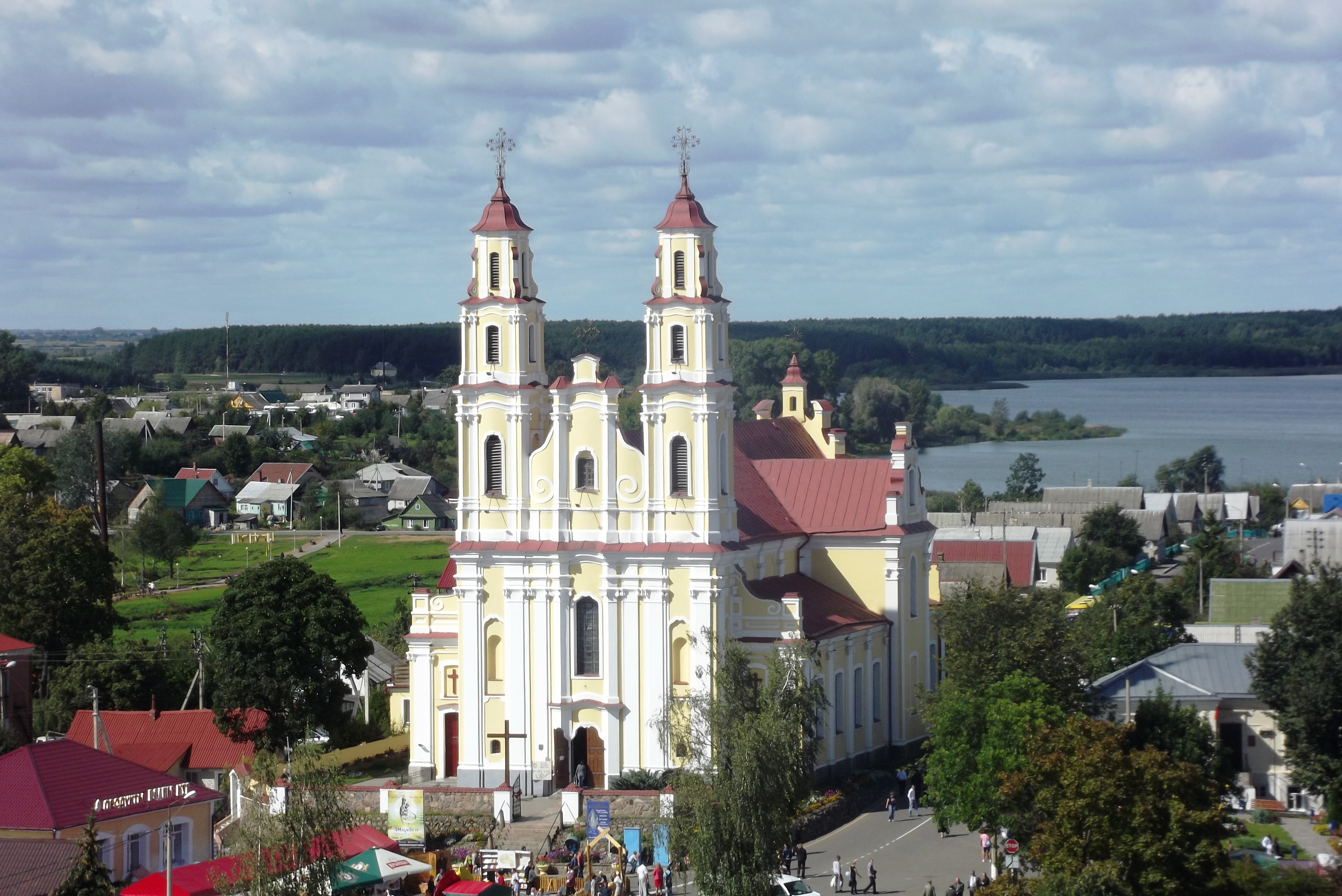
- Church of the Holy Trinity, Hlybokaye
- 55.1408°N 27.6939°E
- Location: Hlybokaye
- Country: Belarus
- Denomination: Catholic church

History
- Status: Cathedral

Architecture
- Functional status: Demolished
- Heritage designation: Cultural heritage of Belarus
- Architectural type: Church
- Style: Baroque
- Years built: 1764—1782

Administration
- Diocese: Diocese of Vitebsk

The Church of the Holy Trinity is a Catholic church in the town of Hlybokaye, Belarus. It belongs to the Hlybokaye Deanery of the Roman Catholic Diocese of Vitebsk. It was made in the Baroque style, it was built between 1764 and 1782, and reconstructed in 1902–1908. The church is located at 1 Sovetskaya Street.

== History ==
=== Polish–Lithuanian Commonwealth ===
The Catholic parish of the Holy Trinity in Hlybokaye was founded in 1628 by the Voivode of Mstsislaw Józef Korsak. A wooden church in the style of early Baroque was built at the same time. From 1628 to 1764, the church building was wooden. Between 1642 and 1654, it was administered by the Discalced Carmelites.

During the Polish-Russian War in 1654, the wooden church burned down.. In 1674, restoration work was still ongoing: "the church, burned by the enemy, has not yet been rebuilt". The wooden church was restored around 1680.

From 1764 to 1782, a stone building of the Church of the Holy Trinity in the style of late Baroque was erected. The construction was initiated by Father Antoni Jaszczołt, who died in 1764, having completed the walls up to the window level. In 1768, the construction was completed by Father Mikhail Fedorovich. The church was consecrated by the Vilnius suffragan bishop Piotr Toczylowski on 11 June 1783 (according to a plaque on the building: 13 July 1783).

=== Russian Empire ===
During the French invasion in 1812, the church was occupied by the Grande Armée and used as a food warehouse. Around 1825, repairs to the building were carried out by Father Mateusz Czeslakiewicz. In 1840, a fire destroyed the church towers.

In 1878, the Russian authorities closed the Carmelite monastery in Hlybokaye, and the Carmelite church —another Catholic church in the town— was converted into the Orthodox Cathedral of the Nativity of the Virgin, a function it retains to this day. The Church of the Holy Trinity remained the only Catholic church in Hlybokaye. However, due to insufficient capacity for all parishioners, the need arose to expand it.

In 1886, the parish priest of the Hlybokaye parish of the Disna Deanery was Father Adam Jakubowski. The reconstruction of the church took place between 1902 and 1908, according to the design of the Vilnius engineer-architect Antoni Adam Filipowicz-Dubowik. Construction work was carried out by the local master Józef Romanowski. The reconstruction left the main 18th-century façade intact, while the remainder of the church was rebuilt in a pseudo-Baroque style imitating Vilnian Baroque. After the expansion, the originally single-nave church became a three-nave basilica.

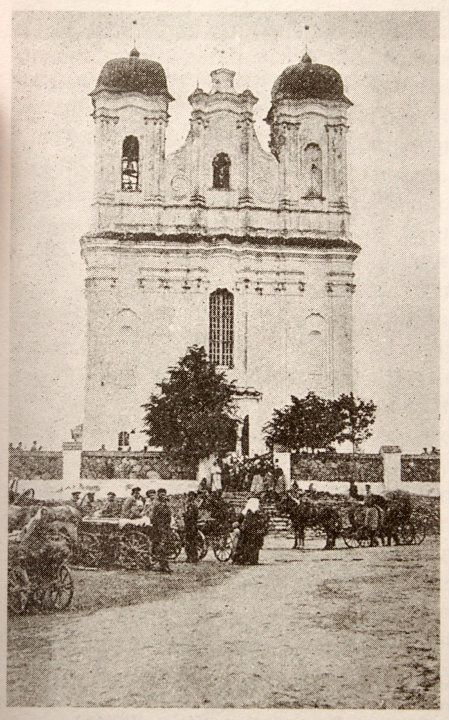
The church in the 19th century

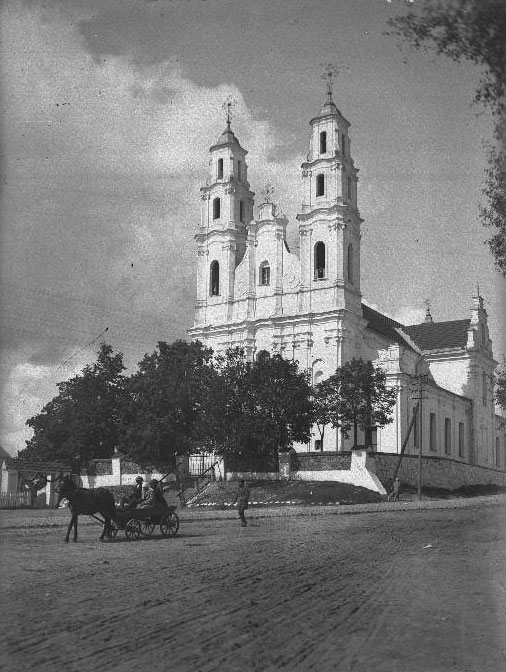
The church in 1939

=== Soviet period ===
The church was destroyed during the liberation of the town by the Red Army in 1944 and was later restored by Father A. Zenkiewicz.

== Architectural features ==
The church is an example of late Baroque architecture, and its dimensions are 41 × 21.5 × 12.5 m. Originally, it had the appearance of a single-nave church with two towers and an elongated semicircular apse. As a result of reconstruction, a transept, side aisles, and sacristies were added, giving the building the spatial composition of a three-nave cruciform basilica. The main façade is rich in architectural plasticity: rows of elegant pilasters, undulating and festooned cornices, figurative arched openings, a high central pediment with side pediments, and the sculpture Crucifixion placed within an arched niche. The façade was flanked by two low towers, which during the reconstruction were raised by two additional tiers and, like the central figurative pediment, acquired elongated vertical proportions. The altar wall of the church is also crowned with a figurative pediment. The walls are articulated with pilasters and cornices and pierced by large arched window openings.

== Interior ==
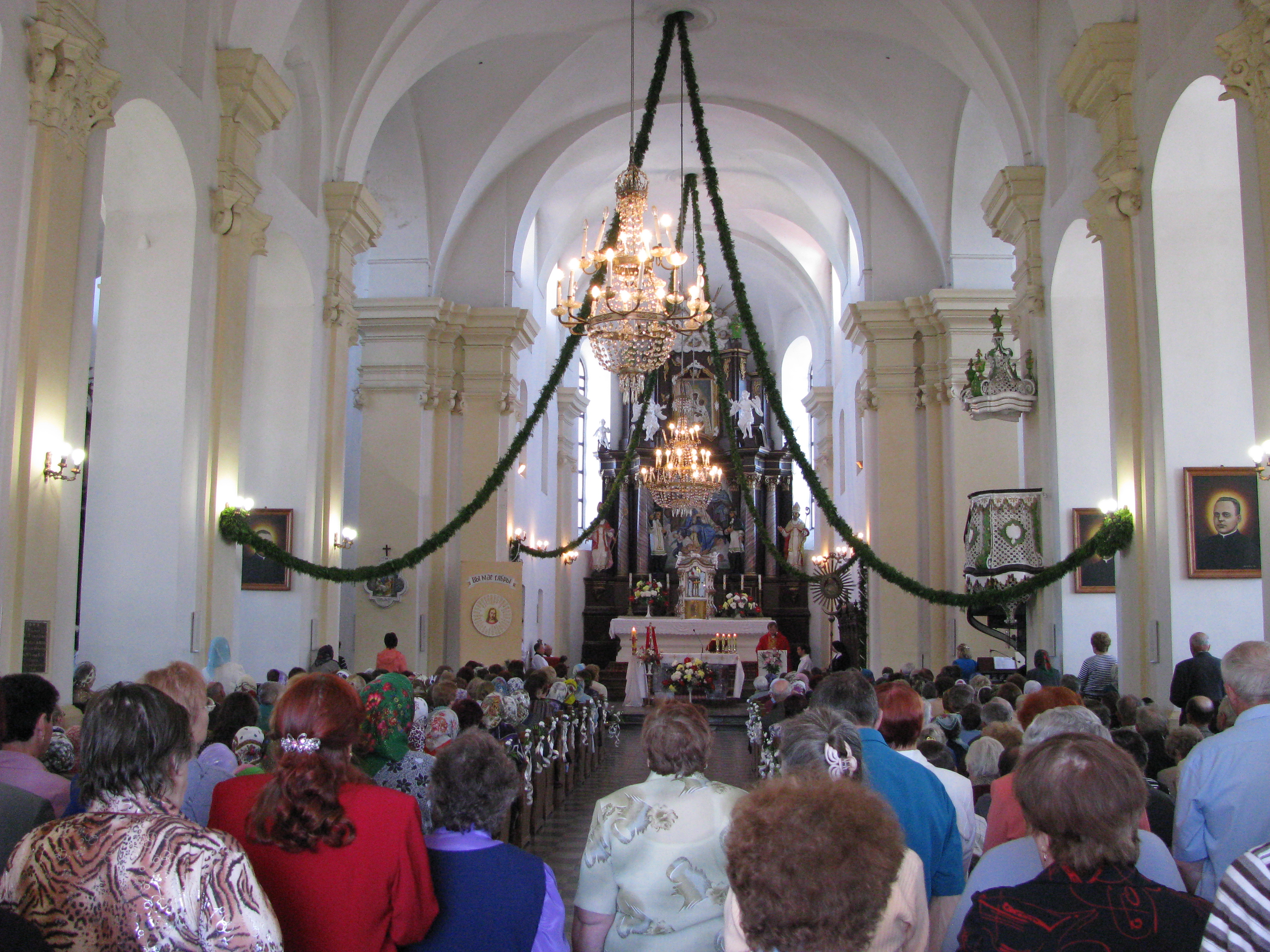
Interior of the church

Inside, the central nave is covered with barrel vaults on centering, while the side aisles are covered with rib vaults. The walls are decorated with pilasters and a continuous cornice band. Above the niches of the side aisles are small ornamental inserts in an ochre–olive color scheme. Three different wooden altars in the Baroque style are present. The central altar of the first tier is decorated with a Corinthian colonnade with a dynamically carved entablature, polychrome sculptural figures of the holy apostles Peter and Paul, and church hierarchs on the sides. The second tier consists of a rectangular cartouche with an icon from the early 18th century: Mother of God Hodegetria, completed with a bas-relief composition Glory with Angels. Also present are the altarpieces Our Lady of the Apparitions and Joseph with the Child (early 18th century), and the icon The Holy Family (1730s). Above the narthex there is a choir loft with a pipe organ in the Neo-Gothic style. The church housed an icon of Josaphat Kuntsevych (120 × 80 cm, canvas, oil), depicting the saint half-length within an oval frame. Below were a mitre and a crossed episcopal staff with a palm branch. In the upper part of the icon, above the clouds, images of four putti were depicted.

== Bibliography ==
- Kulaguin, А. М. (2008). Каталіцкія храмы Беларусі: Энцыкл. даведнік [Catholic Churches of Belarus: Encyclopedic Reference] (in Belarusian). Мінск: (Unknown). ISBN 978-985-11-0395-5.
- Gabrus, T. V. (2001). Мураваныя харалы: Сакральная архітэктура беларускага барока [Walled Choirs: Sacral Architecture of Belarusian Baroque] (in Belarusian). Мінск: Ураджай.
- Збор помнікаў гісторыі і культуры Беларусі. Віцебская вобласць [Collection of Monuments of History and Culture of Belarus. Vitebsk Region] (in Belarusian). Мінск: БелСЭ. 1985. p. 478.
- Kulaguin, А. М. (1995). "З архітэктурнай спадчыны". Памяць: гісторыка-дакументальная хроніка Глыбоцкага раёна [Memory: Historical and Documentary Chronicle of the Hlybokaye District] (in Belarusian). Translated by Хількевіч, А. М. Мінск: (Unknown). pp. 59–73.
