= Cathedral of the Nativity of the Virgin, Hlybokaye =

Orthodox Church in Hlybokaye, Belarus

- Cathedral of the Nativity of the Virgin
- Сабор Нараджэння Прасвятой Багародзіцы
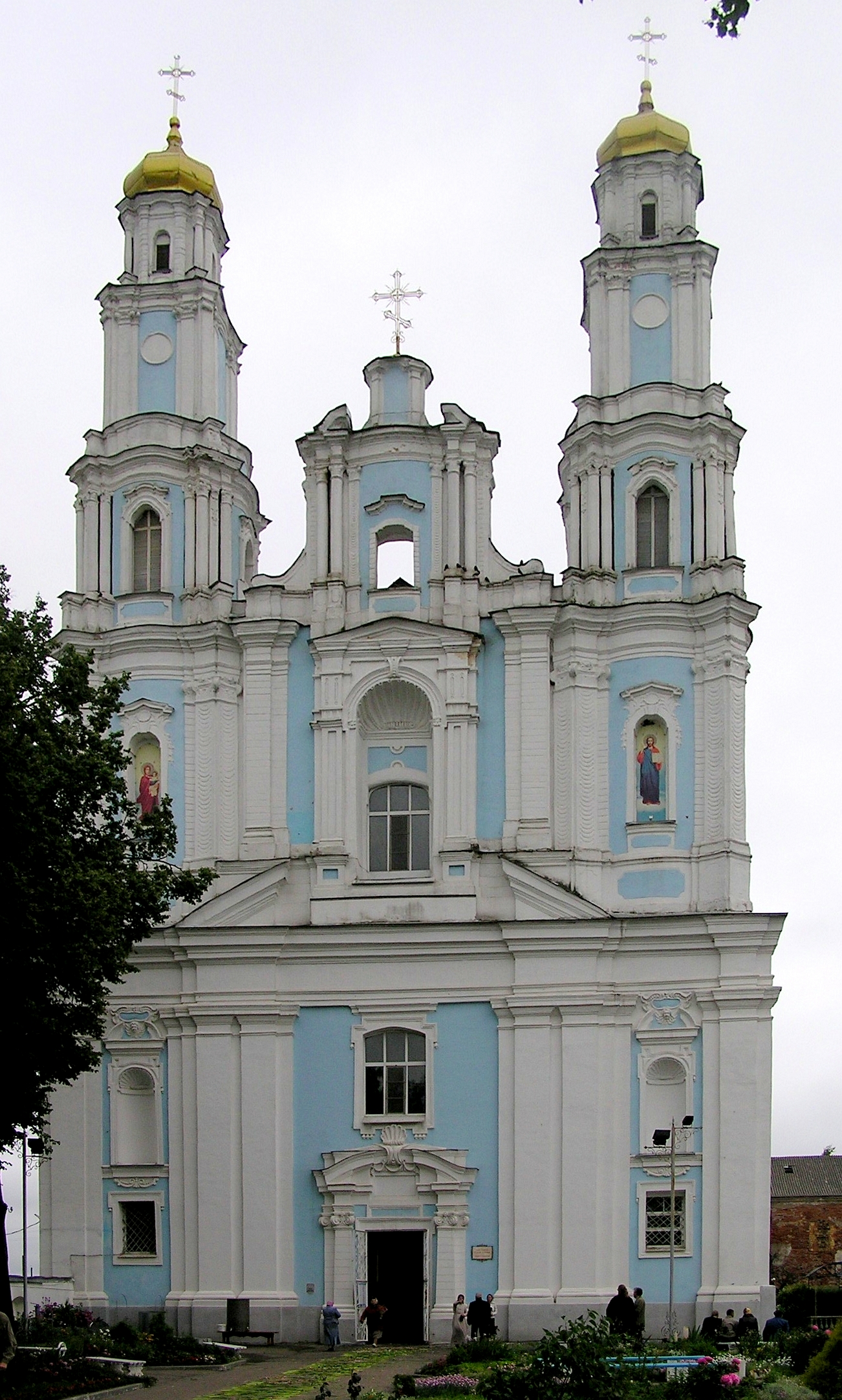

- Location within Belarus
- 55°08′20″N 27°41′51″E
- Location: Hlybokaye
- Country: Belarus
- Denomination: Belarusian Orthodox Church

History
- Status: Cathedral

Architecture
- Heritage designation: Cultural heritage of Belarus
- Architect: Johann Christoph Glaubitz
- Architectural type: Church
- Style: Vilnian Baroque
- Years built: 1731—1756

Specifications
- Materials: Brick

Administration
- Diocese: Diocese of Polotsk and Hlybokaye

The Cathedral of the Nativity of the Virgin (Belarusian: Сабор Нараджэння Прасвятой Багародзіцы) is an Orthodox cathedral in the city of Hlybokaye, Vitebsk Region, Belarus (originally the Church of the Assumption of the Virgin Mary of the Carmelite Order). It is located in the historical center of the town on the 17th of September Square. It is the first monument and the most complete expression of the Vilnian Baroque school in Belarus, reflecting "important stages in the development of the artistic principles of the Belarusian Baroque". According to the researcher V. A. Chanturia, this cathedral is a rather peculiar type of religious architecture, because even in Europe temples with four towers of the Baroque period were very rare. Before the reconstruction in the 1730s, it was the only Sarmatian Baroque monument with a transept. (Note: Thanks to the placement of the transept exactly in the center of the external composition, both the front and side facades of the church acquired mirror symmetry. In the interior, this pair of equal crosses, which forms the upper part of the church, is marked by a dome on the central cross. See: Gabrus T. V. Muravanye haraly: sacral arkhitektura belaruskaga baroka. - Minsk: Uradzhai, 2001. - P. 143. - 286 p. - ISBN 978-985-04-0499-2)

== History ==
=== Kingdom of Poland and the Grand Duchy of Lithuania ===
This architectural monument was built of brick in 1639-1654 (Note: The researcher Gabrus T.V. believes that the actual time of construction of the cathedral and the style of its architecture were influenced by the occupation of Hlybokaye by Russian troops during the Russian-Polish war in 1654-1667 and the burning of the place in 1661, as well as the fire in 1700. See: Габрусь Т. В. Мураваныя харалы: сакральная архітэктура беларускага барока. — Мн.: Ураджай, 2001. — P. 142—143. — 286 p. — ISBN 978-985-04-0499-2) as the Church of Dormition of the Mother of God (Note: The church is sometimes referred to as the Church of the Heart of Jesus. See: Габрусь Т. В. Мураваныя харалы: сакральная архітэктура беларускага барока. — Мн.: Ураджай, 2001. — P. 142. — 286 p. — ISBN 978-985-04-0499-2) in the monastery of the Catholic Discalced Carmelites by Prior Tyszkiewicz. The church was built thanks to the charity of the owner of the part of Hlybokaye, Mstsislaw Voivodeship and headman of Dysna Jozef Lvovich Korsak, (Note: Korsak made a number of other endowments for the church and monastery (1636, 1640 and 1642), including the lands of Mostowiszcze, Svila and Peredola (approved by the Warsaw Sejm in 1647), and bequeathed his property to the Carmelites. See.: Габрусь Т. В. Мураваныя харалы: сакральная архітэктура беларускага барока. — Мн.: Ураджай, 2001. — P. 142. — 286 p. — ISBN 978-985-04-0499-2; Сапунов А., Друцкий-Любецкий В. Материалы по истории и географии Дисненского и Вилейского уездов Виленской губернии. — Витебск: Губернская Типо-Литография, 1896. — P. 103.) who first personally supervised the construction and was buried in the crypt of the church. (Note: Above one of the niches of this crypt there is an inscription in Latin: "Hic ossa, anima in coelo in pace quiescunt illustrissimi fundatoris" ("Here sleep in peace the bones of the noble founder, his soul is in heaven"). See.: Сапунов А., Друцкий-Любецкий В. Материалы по истории и географии Дисненского и Вилейского уездов Виленской губернии. — Витебск: Губернская Типо-Литография, 1896. — P. 104.; Кулагін А. М. Праваслаўныя храмы Беларусі: энцыклапедычны даведнік. — Мн.: БелЭн, 2007. — P. 121. — ISBN 978-985-11-0389-4) Later, when it was rebuilt into a church, the ashes, wrapped in a red cloak, were removed and thrown away, picked up two days later by a local resident and reburied. According to his will of 1643, Korsak also donated seven draught horses for hauling materials for the construction of the church. Subsequently, the Carmelites began to pay the Korsaks, both in money and grain, and took over the responsibility of maintaining the priests and the clergy house. Regardless of the lack of historical evidence, researchers say that there were several rebuildings and additions to the church, as indicated by some parts of the building bearing features of architectural solutions of different periods.

In 1735 the church was rebuilt according to the plan of the architect J. K. Glaubitz: (Note: Sometimes the Grodno architect of Italian origin Jozef Fontana (also known as Joseph Fontana III) is mentioned as the author of the 1735 project. See.: Габрусь Т., Ярашэвіч А. Глыбоцкі кляштар кармелітаў // Вялікае княства Літоўскае / Рэдкал.: Г. П. Пашкоў (гал. рэд.) і інш. — Мн.: БелЭн, 2007. — V. 1. — P. 539. — 688 p. — ISBN 978-985-11-0393-1; Собор Рождества Пресвятой Богородицы / Под редакцией А. В. Вертинской, С. А. Громыко, М. П. Черепковского. — Глубокое, 2001. — P. 5. Польский историк Б. Ванат предполагает, что всем руководил итальянский архитектор Франческо Плачиди. См.: Собор Рождества Пресвятой Богородицы / Под редакцией А. В. Вертинской, С. А. Громыко, М. П. Черепковского. — Глубокое, 2001. — P. 5.; Wanat B. J. Zakon Karmelitów Bosych w Polsce. — Kraków, 1979. — P. 458—471.) in particular, the main façade of the building was changed (the towers were altered and ornamental order decorations were added). (Note: By now, two squat towers of the rear facade have survived from the 1639 building. See.: Всеобщая история архитектуры / Под ред. Максимова П. Н. — М., 1968. — V. VI. — P. 519—520.) It is believed that it was the reconstruction of 1735 that brought to the temple the features typical of the Vilna Baroque school: (Note: At first these changes (both in the facade and in the interior) were attributed to the rococo style by the researcher A. N. Kulagin. See: Кулагін А. М. З архітэктурнай спадчыны // Памяць: гісторыка-дакументальная хроніка Глыбоцкага раёна / Рэд.: Б. І. Сачанка [і інш.]. — Мн., 1995. — P. 59—73.) new tiered towers of the main façade with elongated proportions (decreasing towards the top, such towers acquired special slenderness, steepness and height), orientating not on the façade view, but on the perception of the contours as a complex silhouette among low buildings; the complexity of the main façade by erecting a gable between the towers and enriching it with decoration (to create an impression of richness and confusion through the interweaving of details); girdling the façade with belts of profiles and connecting them with multi-link fusions of pilasters (Note: By covering the planes of these pilasters with an undulating relief, the expressiveness of the contours of the volumes has disappeared. See: Гісторыя беларускага мастацтва / Рэдкал.: С. В. Марцэлеў (гал. рэд.) і інш.; Рэд. тома Я. М. Сахута. — Мн.: Навука і тэхніка, 1988. — V. 2: Другая палова XVI — канец XVIII ст.. — P. 117. — 384 p. — ISBN 978-5-343-00342-0) and columns; increased tension of the rhythmic structure of the elements. After the reconstruction the church was consecrated again on July 16, 1735 by the Vilna suffragan Matej (Jerzy) Antsuta. (Note: This is evidenced by a red marble slab (125 × 93 cm), which was moved after the church was closed and placed in front of the entrance to the cemetery chapel (on Koptevka), and in 1933 was embedded in the porch on the left side of the entrance. The translation of the text on the plaque is as follows "In the name of God! Traveler, pause in reverence and at the sight of the temple give thanks to the immortal name of Korsakov! If you are looking for the Father, look not only in the hearts of the believers, but also in this piece of marble: the venerable Mr. Jozef Korsak, voivode of Mstislavl and headman of Dysna, entrusting himself to the mercy of God, founded this church and endowment in 1640. If you want to know who was the consecrator of this church, you should think of the Most Reverend and in God Most Reverend Jerzy Antsuta, Bishop of Antipatria, Vicar of Vilna, who consecrated this church on July 16, 1735 and gave it to him. May their memory be blessed. Enter the church and try to ask God for absolution". See: Hedemann Ott. Glebokie. — Wilno, 1935. — P. 15.) In 1735, a three-bay, two-story brick gate ("brama") in the late Baroque style was built in front of the church on the same axis as the church (Note: Some researchers attribute these gates, along with the side entrance on the facade and a small drop placed in the refraction of the wall, to the rococo style. See: Hedemann Ott. Glebokie. — Wilno, 1935. — P. 16.; Lorentz St. Wycieczki po wojewodztwie Wilenskiem. — Wilno, 1932. — P. 59.) and a three-story rectangular residential building was added to the northwest side of the apse. From the building, which had a closed composition with an inner courtyard (one wing of the square was the church), only the later rebuilt eastern wing survived; the other two wings were demolished in 1892 due to decay. The monastery itself also housed an elementary school and an aristocratic prison for 12 poor students, a library with 3,000 books, a collection of paintings and engravings, a music chapel, a hospital, a pharmacy, various household and storage buildings, as well as a physics room with 130 different instruments, an extensive garden, and large "planters" with various fish. In the Carmelite church there was a huge organ (12 stops, placed on the choir loft); the order also maintained 40 musicians who played both inside the church and on the balcony above the front doors (on feast days). The peasants were not allowed to enter this church and were directed to the Church of the Trinity in Faro.

There is also an assumption about the construction in the 17th century, even before the church was built, of wide underground passages and rooms with mighty walls and vaults, which, according to the legend, extended not only to the Trinity Church, but even to Berezvechya (3 km).

=== Russian Empire ===
In July 1812, during his stay in Hlybokaye, Napoleon made the Carmelite monastery his residence (more precisely, the three cells of the upper floor of the dwelling house); when leaving it, the emperor is said to have regretted that he could not take the monastery church itself with him to Paris, because he would not be ashamed to place it next to Notre-Dame of Paris. In 1831, after the November Uprising, the buildings of the monastery housed a commission of the military court under the chairmanship of M. N. Muravyov. The crypts in the dungeons of the cathedral and the monastery, where the Carmelites had stored the rebels' arsenal during the uprising, were turned into cells for prisoners, and the main underground corridor itself was divided by a massive grate.

This is how the church is described in the only surviving inventory from 1862:

The church and monastery... founded by Józef Korsak... was built in the shape of a cross. Completed in the year 1735 July 3 and consecrated Jerzy Antsuta, Vilna suffragan... today the church and monastery in a state of disrepair, in need of major repairs...its length is 72, width 32 arşın, has 4 towers — 2 of the façades brick, in one of them non-working clock and 3 bells weighing 196 poods, behind 2 wooden towers ...windows 32, altars 7, an organ for 12 voices ...the church is tiled.

In 1865, (Note: Sometimes 1831 is indicated. See: Слюнькова И. Н. Храмы и монастыри Беларуси XIX века в составе Российской империи. Пересоздание наследия. — М.: Прогресс-Традиция, 2009. — P. 535, 585.), 1842 (см.: Слюнькова И. Н. Монастыри восточной и западной традиций. Наследие архитектуры Беларуси. — М.: Прогресс-Традиция, 2002. — P. 365. — 600 с. — ISBN 978-5-89826-093-4) или 1862 (см.: Габрусь Т., Ярашэвіч А. Глыбоцкі кляштар кармелітаў // Вялікае княства Літоўскае / Рэдкал.: Г. П. Пашкоў (гал. рэд.) і інш. — Мн.: БелЭн, 2007. — V. 1. — P. 539. — 688 с. — ISBN 978-985-11-0393-1) или 1861 год (см.: Кулагін А. М. Праваслаўныя храмы Беларусі: энцыклапедычны даведнік. — Мн.: БелЭн, 2007. — P. 121. — ISBN 978-985-11-0389-4) the Carmelite monastery was closed (its buildings were transferred to the Chamber of State Property). Soon the church was made available to the Orthodox Church, and the monastery itself, with its lands, was allocated for the maintenance of the church. Soon after 1863, the authorities allocated 27 thousand roubles in silver for the reconstruction of the former church. In the autumn of 1867, Orthodox services began, but they were not permanent. In 1872-1878 the reconstruction of the church took place. The changes concerned mainly the interior decoration of the church, the exterior appearance was affected only by the painting of the walls and domes, "in which the charming beauty of watercolor painting was replaced by whitewash on water, with a gray tint". Inside, instead of the Roman altar was installed Orthodox iconostasis with its accessories; from the interior decoration of the precious chandelier, huge candlesticks at the local icons and majestic seven candlesticks on the holy table, which were acquired by the efforts of the local parish and which "its massiveness, size, high quality material and artistic finishing serve as a luxurious decoration of the temple, making up for the unsuccessfully changed original its dignity". Among other things, the organ, side altars and confessionals were removed (royal doors were installed in their place) and the church property was looted. In 1875, (Note: Sometimes 1874 is indicated. See: Слюнькова И. Н. Храмы и монастыри Беларуси XIX века в составе Российской империи. Пересоздание наследия. — М.: Прогресс-Традиция, 2009. — P. 585.) the Orthodox Church became active. Then, on September 3, 1878, the rededication of the rebuilt church to the Orthodox Church of the Nativity of the Holy Virgin took place, presided over by the Kovno Bishop, His Grace Vladimir (Nikolsky). In the celebrations connected with this consecration took part 16 priests, 2 deacons and more than 5 thousand pilgrims, and a procession with the antimins and relics took place from the Church of the Holy Trinity in Deepika. The monastery building was given to the city police, and the library of three thousand books was given to the Vilna Antiquities Museum (the archives ended up in St. Petersburg), along with a collection of paintings and geographical maps, a physics cabinet; the rest was looted. As late as the 1930s, a white marble slab with the inscription "Roku 1782. Grzesznik prosi o jednę: Zdrowaś Marya" ("1782. The sinner asks one thing: Virgin Mary, rejoice...").

When the church was rebuilt after 1863, a wooden tholobate and dome in the neo-Gothic style (Note: According to other sources, in 1895. See: Всеобщая история архитектуры / Под ред. Максимова П. Н. — М., 1968. — V. VI. — P. 519—520.) was erected over the church's crossing structure to lower the very high roof structure in 1885. (Note: Sometimes the Neo-Byzantine style is mentioned. See: Габрусь Т. В. Глыбоцкі касцёл і кляштар кармелітаў // Архітэктура Беларусі. — Мн.: БелЭн, 1993. — P. 149. — 620 p. — ISBN 978-5-85700-078-6; Hedemann Ott. Glebokie. — Wilno, 1935. — P. 17.)

According to the data of 1892 the church belonged to the Hlybokaya Eparchy. It had enough equipment for the services. Already in 1872 for the repair and maintenance of the church was allocated 94 tithes of land with a dwelling house and outbuildings (in 1892 — income of 150 rubles per year), an orchard (income of 105 rubles per year), a watermill (income of 75 rubles per year) and the former two-storey stone Carmelite house (the place of accommodation of the priesthood), part of which was leased to the post office (150 rubles) and pharmacy (50 rubles). Also brought income and renting the former Carmelite wooden house (26 rubles 50 kopecks). In 1892 there were 2 priests and 2 readers for the church, whose salary amounted to 992 rubles and an additional 21 rubles 18 kopecks. Other land was 111 tithes, of which 5 dessiatinas were homestead land, 37 — arable land, 28 — hayfield, and 33 dessiatinas were "under the forest and lake". In total to the parish of the temple belonged 2 tributary and 2 cemetery churches, poor on utensils and are in a dilapidated state, 683 yards with the number of parishioners in 2752 men and 2665 women.

=== Poland and the Soviet Union ===
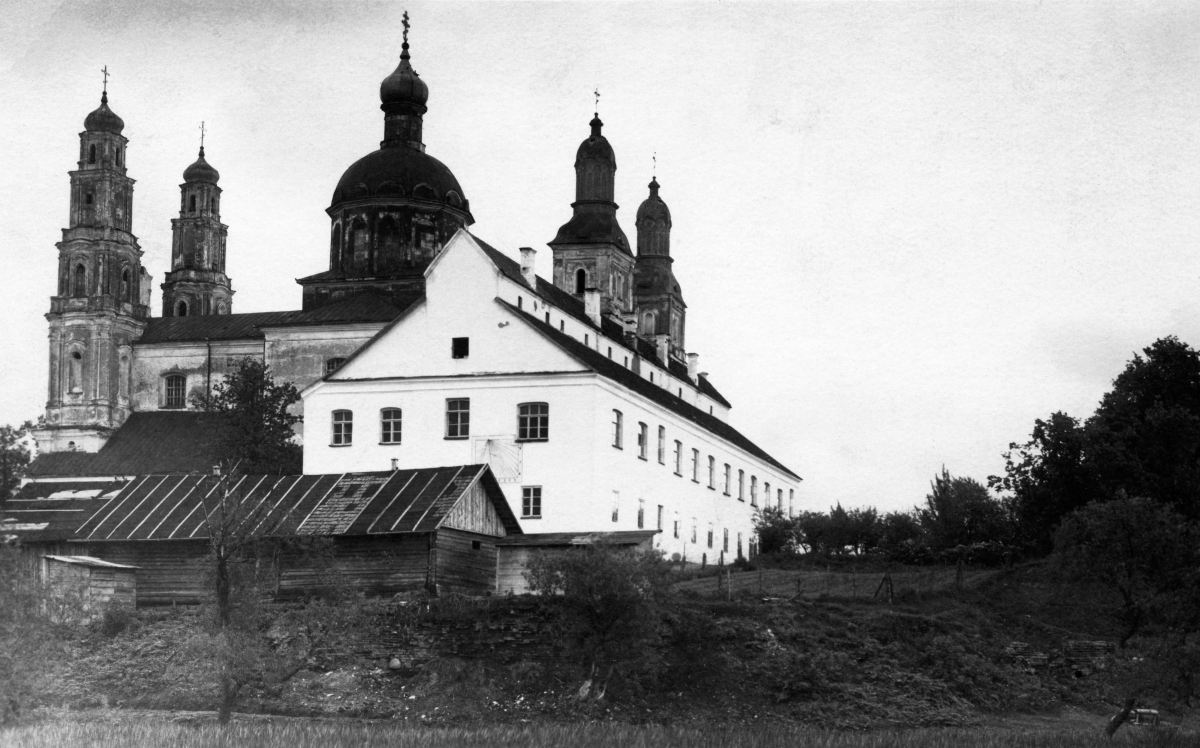
All four towers of the church are shown in a photograph from the Polish period.

According to one source, the church building was returned to the Catholics in 1921. It was rebuilt in 1932. According to another source, the process of return of the property to the Carmelites was in progress since 1927. Attempts to return the church to the Catholics were unsuccessful. In the surviving buildings of the monastery there was the Hlybokaye Starostwo.

During the World War II the dungeons of the cathedral were used by Rodionov's collaborators as a prison for their prisoners. The church building was partially damaged during the war: in 1944 the wooden drum with the dome and the upper levels of the towers were burned, many icons, the altar and the church archives were damaged. Unlike the church itself, which was covered with iron roofing, the towers were rebuilt, but in a reduced form. After the war, the monastery buildings were used as an oil factory, later as a zonal archive, and the dungeons of the church itself were used as a warehouse of the Hlybokaye canning factory.

In the "List of churches, monasteries and worship spaces in the Hlybokaye region", which was included in the state registry in 1945, the church was again mentioned as the Church of the Nativity of the Virgin. It had only one building in use; no contract for the right of use was signed by the believers. There was also no auditing commission for the church, nor was there an ecclesiastical committee for the administration of church buildings.

In 1970, Archbishop Antonij (Melnikov) of Minsk and Belarusia, accompanied by Hegumen Valentine, associate professor of the Moscow Theological Academy, and B. A. Burakov, dean of the Vitebsk district, held a service in the church of Hlybokaye on September 10-13 (probably the evening of September 12 and the morning of the next day). In addition to decorations, the church was decorated with carpets. According to the local authorities, the attendance at the service was massive: the number of believers in the church ranged from 5 thousand (Burakov's data) to 700 people (Dean Ivanov); the choir sang. There were 15 regular priests and 1 extraordinary priest, the priest of the Hlybokaye church I. I. Frantskevich. He and the spiritual adviser of the Lastovichi Old Believers' Church S. D. Fedorov. Dean Ivanov reported to Antonij about the presence of the latter at the service and presented to the Archbishop the priest Frantskevich. The priest of the Chashniki church N. F. Kublitsky was also presented to the Archbishop Antonij. According to N.F. Vysotskaya in 1983 the church was illuminated and bars were installed, but there was no alarm system and telephone network. In the same year 1983 on the north side of the altar in the temple was created a warm church, namely the side chapel in honor of St. Seraphim of Sarov with the area of 80 m^{2}, consecrated on December 29 of the same year. In the years 1988-1990 the temple was renovated both inside and outside: in particular, the roof was covered with galvanized iron. The attached church in honor of the Exaltation of the Life-Giving Cross in the village of Zabelie, closed in 1963, was restored and consecrated in 1990.

=== The Republic of Belarus ===
The parish of this Hlybokaye Cathedral is currently the largest one in the Polotsk diocese. The church has a Sunday school for children and adults, a children's choir, an Orthodox library and a professional choir, and a "Society of Orthodox Youth in the Name of St. Seraphim of Sarov". In September 2012, Sunday school students planted a young prayer garden near the church. The rector of the cathedral is Archpriest Sergey Gromyko.

== Architecture ==
Plan of the Cathedral

The church is the first monument of Vilnian Baroque architecture in Belarus. Before the reconstruction in 1735 it was one of the most interesting examples of the Sarmatian Baroque. (Note: The main parameters of the structure were chosen in accordance with the basic requirements of the Carmelite Order: the distance between the pilasters of the central nave was 9.6 m, the width of the side chapels was 4.2 m, and the length of the transept was chosen to be half the width of the central nave. See: Слюнькова И. Н. Монастыри восточной и западной традиций. Наследие архитектуры Беларуси. — М.: Прогресс-Традиция, 2002. — С. 366. — 600 с. — ISBN 978-5-89826-093-4) The church was originally a long rectangle in plan (this strictly rectangular form precisely included all volumetric and spatial parts of the church), has a simplified planning solution, including a three-nave basilica, a rectangular apse (presbytery) and a series of cells behind it, connected by a sacristy (one of the monastery buildings, attached directly to the rear flat wall of the altar part and dated to the same time of construction). On the contrary, the volumetric and spatial composition of the church is characterized by a multilevel and multidimensional view. Thus, in addition to the four towers that mark the corners of the church, it is characterized by a two-tiered fall of the aisles with transept wings. These four towers were tented roofs. (Note: According to other sources, the temple was originally a three-aisled basilica with two towers, the number of which reached four after the building was extended. Thus the temple received an original volume-spatial symmetrical composition with a developed silhouette (for the perception from many points, because the temple is the main building in the spatial composition of Glubokoe). The idea of the transition from two to four towers may have been taken from the temples with four towers in Belarus and Lithuania in the 15-17th centuries, but the similarity is conditional, because in the older temples the tower had a defensive function. See: Чантурия В. А. История архитектуры Белоруссии. — Мн.: Вышэйшая школа, 1977. — P. 182.; Чантурия В. А. Памятники архитектуры и градостроительства Белоруссии. — Мн.: Полымя, 1986. — P. 206. — 240 p.; Всеобщая история архитектуры / Под ред. Максимова П. Н. — М., 1968. — V. VI. — P. 519—520.) Both façade towers were then demolished to the eaves of the side aisles and replaced by continuous four-story quadrangular towers with beam and semicircular openings. The original four towers had a genetic connection with the defensive fortified churches of the Belarusian lands, (Note: According to T. V. Gabrus, in addition, there was a "conscious imitation of a medieval knight's castle". See: Габрусь Т. В. Мураваныя харалы: сакральная архітэктура беларускага барока. — Мн.: Ураджай, 2001. — P. 143. — 286 p. — ISBN 978-985-04-0499-2) but their form and importance for the composition belong to the mature Baroque, and the reconstruction of the towers of the main façade in 1735 reflected the development and improvement of the national forms of this style. The stylistic features of the altar with two four-sided towers flanking it and a triangular pediment completing it correspond to the Sarmatian Baroque.

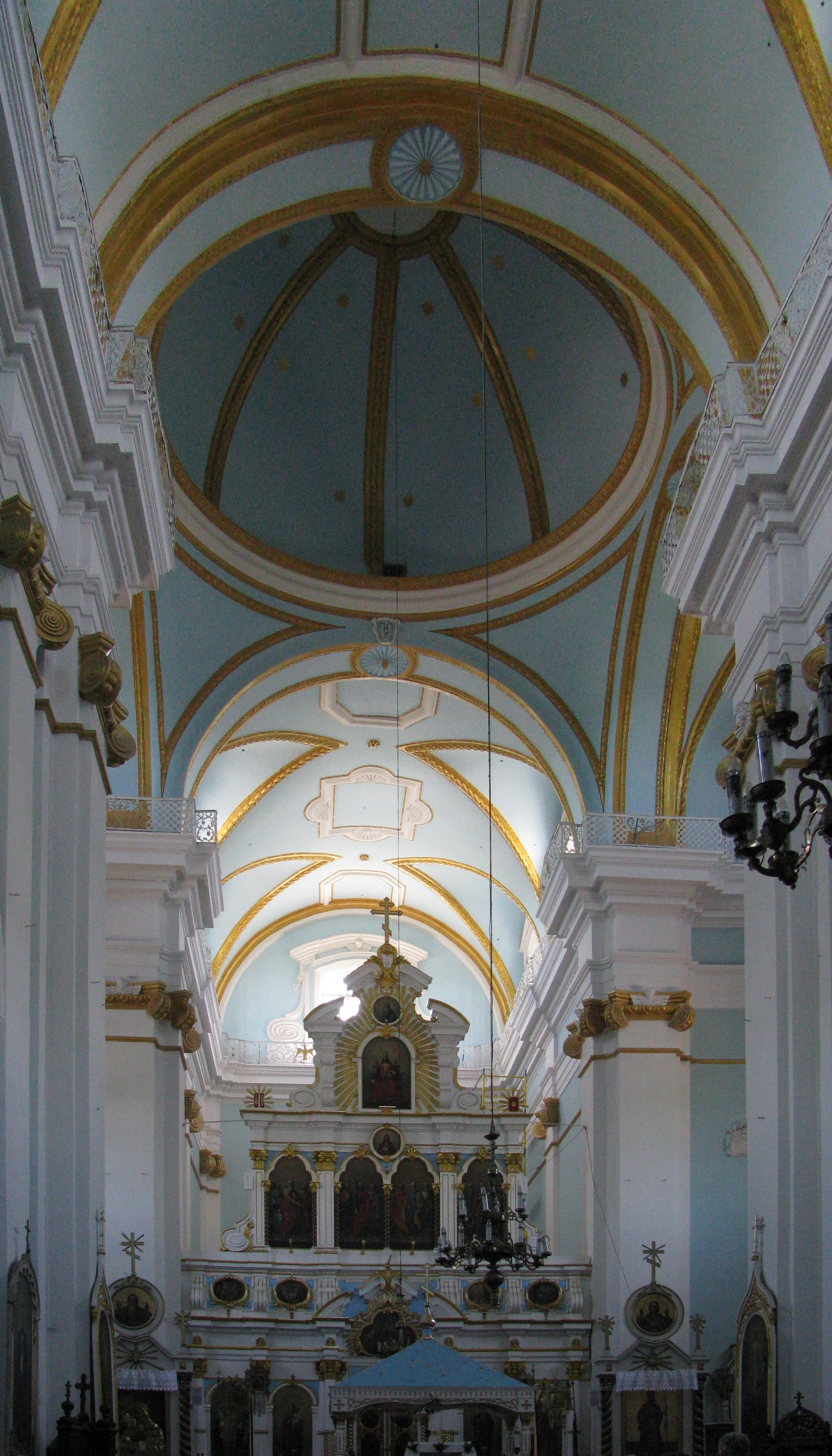
Interior of the Cathedral.

The main façade of the church, on which the main emphasis is placed, is flanked by two slender tiered towers crowned with onion domes, and is characterized by a shaped stepped pediment erected between the towers. The vertical dynamic aspiration of the latter is emphasized and strengthened by narrow and high arched openings along with numerous brackets. It is hard to judge about the original design of the main façade, but according to the researcher Sliunkova I. N. it probably followed the Roman architectural models, more precisely the three-axis composition, in which the lower part of the basilica is decorated with a system of pilasters, and the upper part with a triangular pediment and volutes on the sides (such volutes were later presented in the two upper tiers of the iconostasis). The richly decorated entrance portal with carved doors of the XVII century with gilding highlights the center of the lower façade tier, while the niches — exedras finished with conchas, its sides. Between the lowest level and the next, there is an entablature framed by pilasters with rounded sides, followed by a wide bracketed pediment. The window in the gap of this pediment is decorated with a clearly protruding plastic portal. The attic pediment, which represents the third level, has a complex finish. Even in 1735, this façade was richly decorated with order plastics - in particular, there were added bundles of pilasters, bracings, wavy belt courses and so on. The openwork of the main façade was given by the through openings of towers and pediments together with deep niches (tabernacles) resembling exotic shells. (Note: According to T. V. Gabrus, openwork together with plasticity acquired only gables with the forms of towers, which determined the shaped open spaces, the same scalloping, layered pilasters, broken and wavy cornices. See: Габрусь Т. В. Мураваныя харалы: сакральная архітэктура беларускага барока. — Мн.: Ураджай, 2001. — P. 143. — 286 p. — ISBN 978-985-04-0499-2) The rear façade of the temple was designed in more restrained forms: thus it is characterized by a triangular pediment with a circular niche in the center, decorated with cross-shaped lesenes, and two symmetrical quadrangular towers.

The wooden dome, which burned down in 1944 along with the wooden tops of the towers and the tholobate, together with the four poppies of the towers, was the only easily executed, but at the same time radical way to adapt the architecture of the Carmelite Church, which had similarities with the Cathedral of the Theotokos to the needs of the Orthodox Church. Despite the inconsistency with Western European baroque architecture, the poppies "coded the church as a new convert for the Orthodox".

The naves of the temple, the interior of which has preserved its volume-space composition of the XVII century, are overlapped by cylindrical vaults with decks. Above the babiniet of the temple there are choirs. During the reconstruction in 1735 for the façade of the church and its interior was made a single order design. Thus, the walls and pillars of the temple are characterized by the scattering of pilasters and wide cornice belts, whose decoration is a rich floral ornament with motifs of stylized acanthus leaves in addition to high relief images of angels' heads. The decoration of the vaults, especially the plafonds and the frames of the ribs of the decks, is characterized by geometric stucco ornamentation. The long gallery, which runs along the entire perimeter of the temple's entablature, is surrounded by a forged metal grille with ornamentation. The molding used in the interior decoration is made in the technique of stucco. In the interior, the mediocrest is decorated with a flat and false dome.

The frescoes that once decorated the vaults and part of the walls were covered with a layer of plaster when the temple was rebuilt into an Orthodox church. According to the 1878 recollections of Alexander Kotlinsky, the first dean of the rebuilt church, these murals were "of beautiful beauty".

There was once an extensive garden attached to the temple.

== Icons ==
According to the "Law on preliminary inspection of religious buildings in the cities of Polotsk, Glubokoe, Orsha, Vitebsk" of October 20, 1963, during the inspection of the cathedral no objects and paintings of artistic value were found. At the same time, only two icons attracted the attention of researchers due to their precise dating. The first, an icon of the Black Madonna of Częstochowa, was 1x1.5 meters in size and painted in oil. Its fine-grained canvas was glued directly on wood. On the picture was found the following inscription in Early Cyrillic alphabet: "The image of the Blessed Virgin Mary, the Mother of God of Czestochowa, built to decorate the Gluboka church in 1757 at the expense of the Gluboka citizen Fyodor Gritskevich, renewed in 1898 under the priest Vlad. Kontsevich. The icon, according to the story of the church servant Yasukevich, was taken from the chapel in the Dubrov cemetery after a fire in it.

The second icon, a picture of the Virgin and Child, was 50×60 cm and had a bronze riza. Its canvas, consisting of two layers: fine-grained (the first) and coarse-grained (the second), was glued directly to the plate. The lower part of the icon was covered with silver paint, on which a black inscription was written in two lines: "S Maria Mater dei \\ Anno 1738". The lower line was written in blue ink. The icon was brought to the Cathedral from the village of Soroki after the demolition of the local church in 1963. This icon is still in the temple among other images, the iconostasis of which was placed in 1863. According to the 1995 data, the image, whose silver and gilded frame is considered a work of Rococo art, was placed in the chapel of the same name in the church, located in the cemetery.

There is also an icon "Axion Estin" in the temple, which is an exact copy of the miraculous image from the Athos Karyes Church and has the dimensions of 1.6×1.15 meters. Inside the image, painted with oil paints on cypress wood and sprinkled with water from the Jordan River and a number of other life-giving springs, were enclosed and permanently sealed particles of the relics of many saints, as well as pieces of absorbent cotton previously consecrated on the Holy Sepulchre, Holy relics and many icons of the Mother of God, as well as pieces of absorbent cotton soaked in holy oil taken from the altar lamps at the Holy Sepulchre, the Holy Sepulchre of the Mother of God, and at Calvary ("and in it were hidden many gracious holy things from Jerusalem and from Mount Athos"). According to the gift inscription on the back of the icon, it is "a gift from some of the poorest Russian St. George monks-patriots to the venerable father, rector of the Orthodox Church in honor of the Nativity of the Virgin Cathedral in Hlybokaye, Lithuanian diocese, Vilna Governorate, Disna uezd, priest Euthymius Divolovsky with the parish and parish for this church inalienable property, as a blessing from the Holy Mount Athos to this church, parishioners, to the village and the whole district of the Orthodox inhabitants — permanent and temporary, present and future, clerical and military, official and ordinary, to help them all from all troubles, evils and attacks from all and on all, visible and invisible, manifest and secret, external and internal enemies of Russia and the Tsar, Orthodoxy and Christianity". In addition, the inscription contains a prayer to the Blessed Virgin Mary for the Church, the parish and the country. The icon is known for healings and the fact of myroblyting in 1999-2000. According to the "Lithuanian Diocesan Newspaper" for 1911, the icon was delivered to Hlybokaye in June 1911. A special procession was organized with the participation of clergy and pilgrims (about 13 thousand), which for three days travelled 35 miles with the icon, stopping for prayers in the villages of Verkhnie and Lasitsa and approaching Hlybokaye in the evening of June 12. Another procession was held with the participation of nuns from the Berezvechie Convent, who, after joining the processions, carried the icon to the church, and a service with the Akathist to the Mother of God was held (the next day the Christian liturgy and the consecration with holy water were already held on the lake in Berezvechie near the chapel), in which a member of the State Duma, priest Alexander Veraksin, took part. A report of this event was sent to Agafangel, Archbishop of Vilna and Lithuania, who in turn presented it to the Emperor. In honor of the event, it was decided to hold the corresponding services every year on June 12 and 13 (according to the Julian calendar). In recent years, the old tradition of a procession with the icon from the Cathedral to the newly opened Berezvech Convent has been renewed, with the faithful covering the road with flowers and the clergy carrying the image in their arms. In 2011, the 100th anniversary of the icon was celebrated from June 21 to June 26.

== Abbots of the Cathedral ==
	Abbots' names	Time of service
1	Illarion Ioannovich Villyanovsky	03.09.1878 — 08.05.1890
2	Nikolao Ioannovich Nikolsky	08.05.1890 — 25.03.1897
3	Vladimir Ioannovich Koncevich	29.05.1897 — 07.12.1901
4	Dmitriy Vladimirovich Markevich	12.01.1902 — 10.03.1902
5	ALeksandr Yakovlevich Smirnov	10.03.1902 — 17.05.1908
6	Yevfimiy Alekseevich Divolovskiy	17.05.1908 — 05.1917
7	Nikolai Aleksandrovich Ignatovich	06.1917 — 21.01.1948
8	Vasiliy Grigorievich Skurko	03.03.1948 — 28.06.1960
9	Ioann Mikhailovich Stosuy	09.08.1960 — 01.10.1962
10	Valentin Konstantinovich Bogatkevich	01.10.1962 — 06.06.1963
11	Ioann Mikhailovich Stosuy	06.06.1963 — 15.11.1963
12	Arkadiy Vladimirovich Strelovskiy	15.11.1963 — 05.10.1964
13	Evgeniy Mikhailovich Ameliyanyuk	24.02.1966 — 29.08.1967
14	Mikhail Iosifovich Yuraschik	29.08.1967 — 12.12.1967
15	Archimandrite Afanasiy (Kudyuk)	12.12.1967 — 10.01.1969
16	Aleksandr Vasilievich Ivanov	10.01.1969 — 15.07.1974
17	Iosif Iosifovich Shevchenko	15.07.1974 — 1978
18	Serafim Adamovich Gogolushko	1978 — 18.05.1997
19	Dmitriy Petrovich Avsiyevich	20.05.1997 — 03.09.2003
20	Serguiy Alekseevich Gromiko	Since 03.09.2003

== Bibliography ==
=== In Russian language ===
- Всеобщая история архитектуры / Под ред. Максимова П. Н. — М., 1968. — V. VI.
- Города, местечки и замки Великого княжества Литовского / Т. В. Белова (пред.) [и др.]. — Мн.: БелЭн, 2009. — 312 p. — ISBN 978-985-11-0432-7
- Извеков Н. Д. Статистическое описание православных приходов Литовской епархии. — Вильна: Типография И. Блюмовича, 1893.
- Панкрат Анна. 100-летие чудотворной иконы, привезённой с Афона // Полоцкие епархиальные ведомости. — 2011. — No. 3. — P. 3—4.
- Православная церковь на Витебщине (1918—1991): док. и материалы / Редкол.: М. В. Пищуленок (гл. ред.) [и др.]; сост. В. П. Коханко (отв. сост.) [и др.]. — Мн.: НАРБ, 2006. — 365 p. — ISBN 978-985-6372-48-6
- Сапунов А., Друцкий-Любецкий В. Материалы по истории и географии Дисненского и Вилейского уездов Виленской губернии. — Витебск: Губернская Типо-Литография, 1896.
- Слюнькова И. Н. Монастыри восточной и западной традиций. Наследие архитектуры Беларуси. — М.: Прогресс-Традиция, 2002. — 600 p. — ISBN 978-5-89826-093-4
- Слюнькова И. Н. Храмы и монастыри Беларуси XIX века в составе Российской империи. Пересоздание наследия. — М.: Прогресс-Традиция, 2009.
- Собор Рождества Пресвятой Богородицы / Под редакцией А. В. Вертинской, С. А. Громыко, М. П. Черепковского. — Глубокое, 2001.
- Чантурия В. А. История архитектуры Белоруссии. — Мн.: Вышэйшая школа, 1977. — P. 182.
- Чантурия В. А. Памятники архитектуры и градостроительства Белоруссии. — Мн.: Полымя, 1986. — 240 p.

=== In Belarusian language ===
- Багласаў С. Г. Царква Раства Багародзіцы // Збор помнікаў гісторыі і культуры Беларусі. Віцебская вобласць. — Мн.: БелСЭ, 1985. — 496 p. — 8000 copies.
- Барока ў беларускай культуры і мастацтве / Навук. пэд. В. Ф. Шматаў. — Мн.: Беларуская навука, 2001. — 304 p. — ISBN 978-985-08-0452-5
- Габрусь Т. В. Глыбоцкі касцёл і кляштар кармелітаў // Архітэктура Беларусі. — Мн.: БелЭн, 1993. — 620 p. — ISBN 978-5-85700-078-6
- Габрусь Т. В. Мураваныя харалы: сакральная архітэктура беларускага барока. — Мн.: Ураджай, 2001. — 286 p. — ISBN 978-985-04-0499-2
- Габрусь Т. В., Ярашэвіч А. А. Глыбоцкі касцёл і кляштар кармелітаў // Рэлігія і царква на Беларусі: Энцыкл. давед. / рэдкал.: Г. П. Пашкоў і інш. — Мн.: БелЭн, 2001. — 368 p. — ISBN 978-985-11-0220-0
- Габрусь Т., Ярашэвіч А. Глыбоцкі кляштар кармелітаў // Вялікае княства Літоўскае / Рэдкал.: Г. П. Пашкоў (гал. рэд.) і інш. — Мн.: БелЭн, 2007. — V. 1. — 688 p. — ISBN 978-985-11-0393-1
- Гісторыя беларускага мастацтва / Рэдкал.: С. В. Марцэлеў (гал. рэд.) і інш.; Рэд. тома Я. М. Сахута. — Мн.: Навука і тэхніка, 1988. — V. 2: Другая палова XVI — канец XVIII ст.. — 384 p. — ISBN 978-5-343-00342-0
- Памяць: гісторыка-дакументальная хроніка Глыбоцкага раёна / Рэд.: Б. І. Сачанка [і інш.]. — Мн., 1995.
- Кулагін А. М. З архітэктурнай спадчыны // Памяць: гісторыка-дакументальная хроніка Глыбоцкага раёна / Рэд.: Б. І. Сачанка [і інш.]. — Мн., 1995. — P. 59—73.
- Кулагін А. М. Праваслаўныя храмы Беларусі: энцыклапедычны даведнік. — Мн.: БелЭн, 2007. — ISBN 978-985-11-0389-4

=== In Polish language ===
- Hedemann Ott. (1935). Glebokie. Wilno.
- Lorentz St. (1932). Wycieczki po wojewodztwie Wilenskiem. Wilno.
- Słownik geograficzny Królestwa Polskiego i innych krajów słowiańskich. Vol. II: Derenek — Gżack. Warszawa. 1881.
