= Johann Christoph Glaubitz =

German-Polish architect

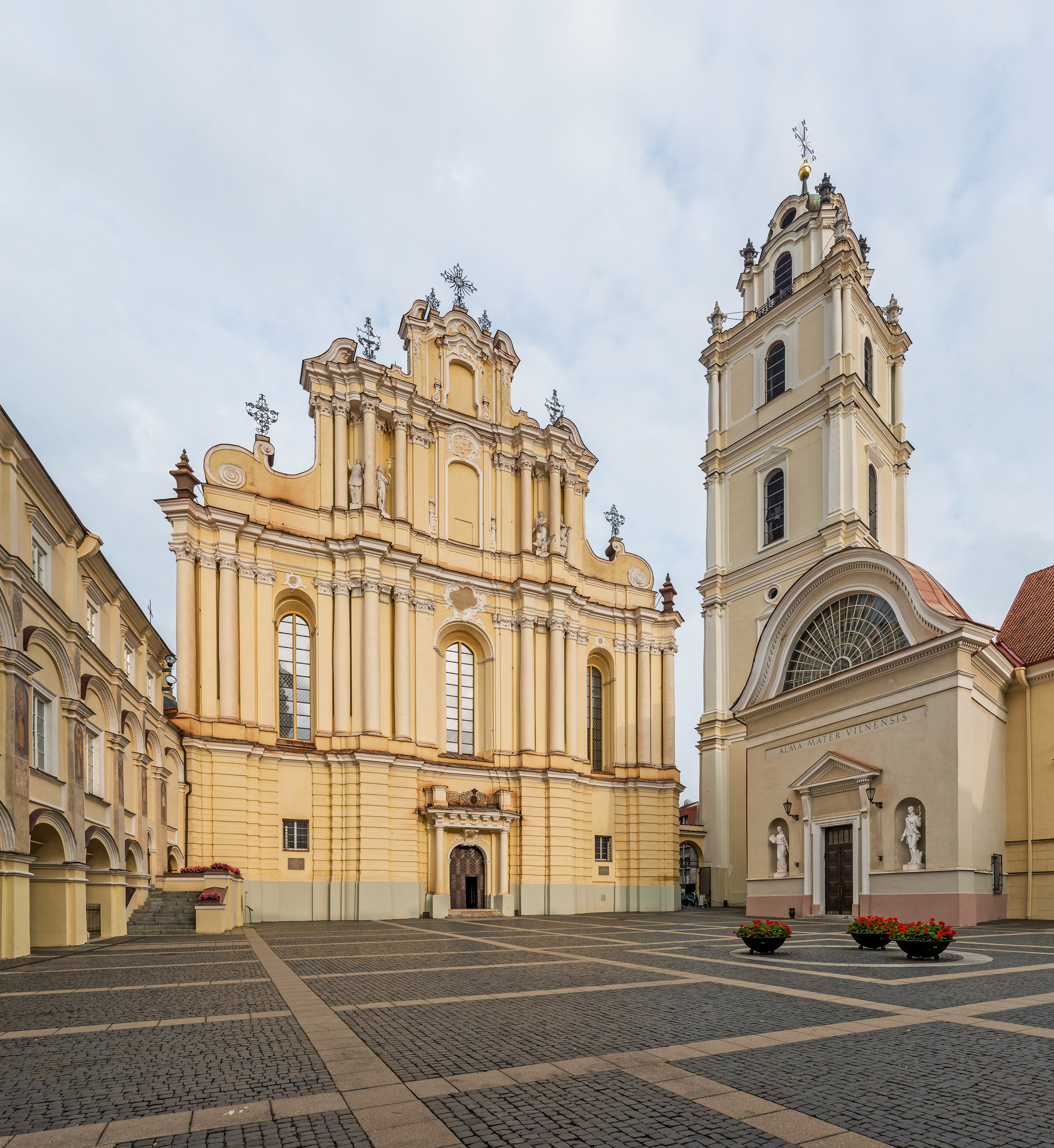
Facade of Church of St. Johns, Vilnius, Glaubitz's finest work

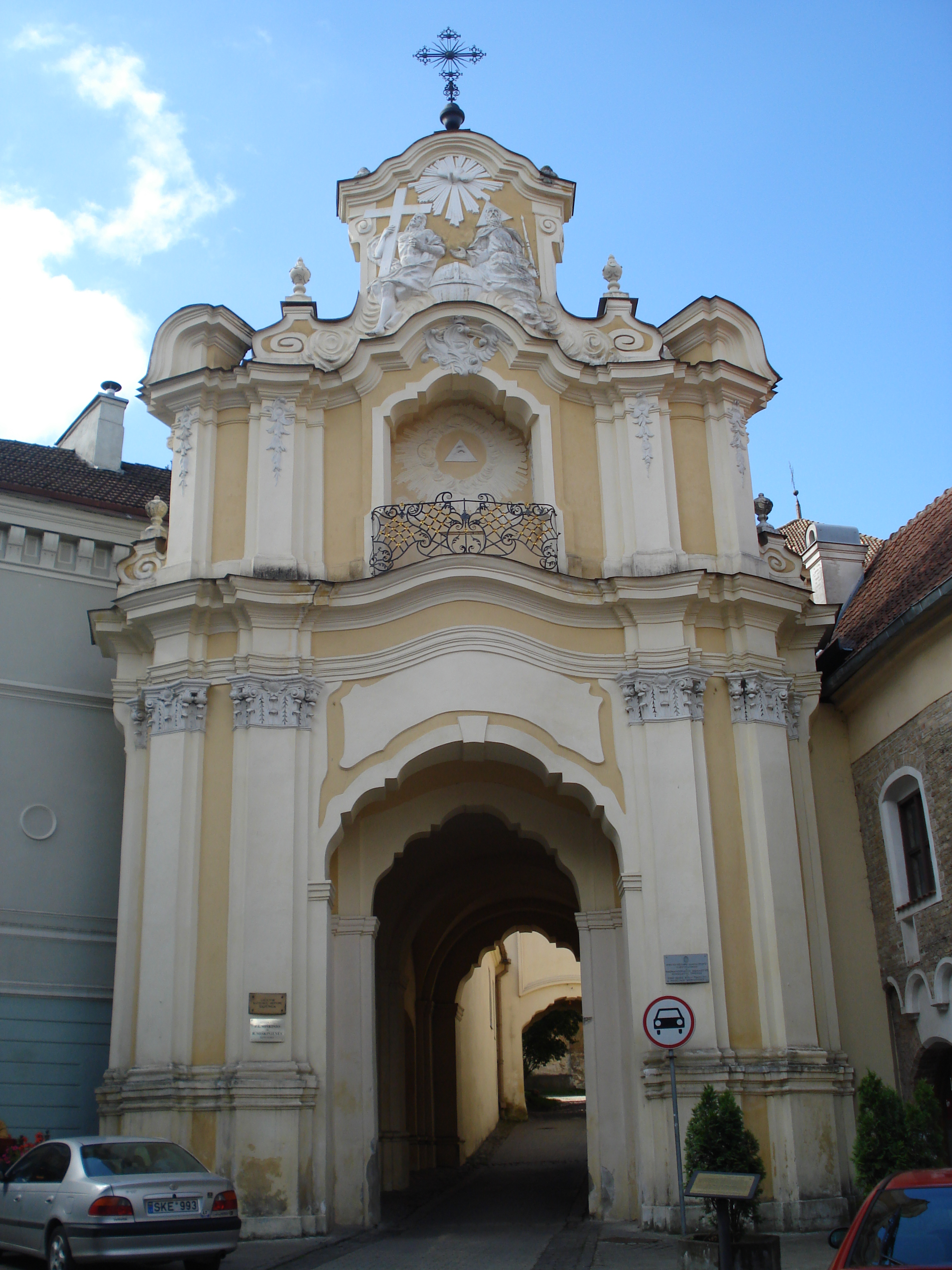
Basilian Gate of the Holy Trinity monastery in Vilnius

Johann Christoph Glaubitz (Lithuanian: Jonas Kristupas Glaubicas; Polish: Jan Krzysztof Glaubitz c. 1700 – 30 March 1767) was a Lithuanian architect of German descent who is generally considered to be the most prominent Vilnian Baroque architect in the Grand Duchy of Lithuania.

Glaubitz is credited as one of the creators of the Vilnian Baroque architecture style, which is best reflected in the cityscape of the Vilnius Old Town. This has contributed to the widespread naming of Old Vilnius as the "City of Baroque".

== Biography ==
=== Early life ===
Details of Galubitz’s life, especially his early years, are poorly known. He first appears in the records in 1732–1733 as a mason’s journeyman working under the master Gottfried Forster. According to Vladas Drėma and Stanisław Lorentz, he was born in Świdnica, in Silesia, though this remains only a supposition. In 1737 he appeared in Vilnius, where he initially worked as a mason on the Chapel of Saint Barbara in the Church of St. John, until 1739.

=== Vilnius ===
Glaubitz, who was among the leaders of the Lutheran community of Vilnius. His first independent project was the reconstruction of the Evangelical church in Vilnius between 1739 and 1743. His next commission, the reconstruction of the Church of St. Catherine for the Benedictine nuns between 1741 and 1744, brought him considerable recognition. In 1743 he took over and completed the construction of the church in Stolowicze.

In 1749 he entered the service of the Uniate Archbishop of Polotsk, Florian Hrebnicki, for whom he built a palace in Strunie and also completed the construction of Saint Sophia Cathedral in Polotsk, which had most likely been begun by Guido Antonio Longhi.

At the same time he worked for the Vilnius Jesuits on the construction of the Church of St. John, as well as for the Dominicans on the construction of the church in Zabiały-Wołyńce in the Vitebsk Voivodeship. Glaubitz was also responsible for the reconstruction of the Vilnius Town Hall.

This concludes the list of Glaubitz’s certain major architectural works. He was also the builder of many altars, for example in the Orthodox Church of the Holy Spirit, Vilnius. Many other stylistically similar buildings are often attributed to him, but these attributions remain uncertain.

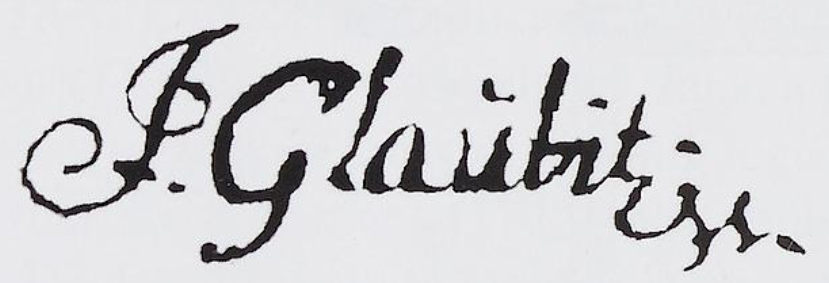
Johann Christoph Glaubitz signature

Among them is Carmelite church of Glubokas (Hlybokaye), which he reconstructed in 1735; it is now the Orthodox Church of the Birth of Theotokos. In 1746—1750, also Mscislaŭ Church of the Assumption of the Blessed Virgin Mary. Other towns with possible Glaubitz's architecture include Mogiliavas (Mogilev), Lyda (Lida), and the Saint Sophia Cathedral in Polotsk, all three in what is now Belarus and Daugavpils in Latvia. The Basilian Church and Monastery in Berezwecz, now part of Hlybokaye, was built in 1776 and demolished in the 1960s and 1970s. Its replica was constructed in Białystok in the 1990s.

== See also ==
- Basilian Monastery in Vilnius
- The Nativity of the Virgin Cathedral in Hlybokaye

== Bibliography ==
- Karpowicz, Mariusz (2011). "Wileńska odmiana architektury XVIII wieku" [The Wilno Variety of the 18th-Century Architecture]. Biuletyn Historii Sztuki. 73 (3–4).
- Stanisław Lorentz, Jan Krzysztof Glaubitz - architekt wileński XVIII wieku, Warszawa 1937
- Kulagin, A. M.; Tzerashchatova, V. V. (1986). Збор помнікаў гісторыі і культуры. Магілёўская вобласць [Collection of Cultural Heritage monuments in Mogilev region]. Minsk: Беларуская Савецкая Энцыклапедыя імя Петруся Броўкі. p. 305.
