= Hlybokaye =

Town in Vitebsk Region, Belarus

Hlybokaye Глыбокае (Belarusian) Глубокое (Russian) Glubokoye
- Town
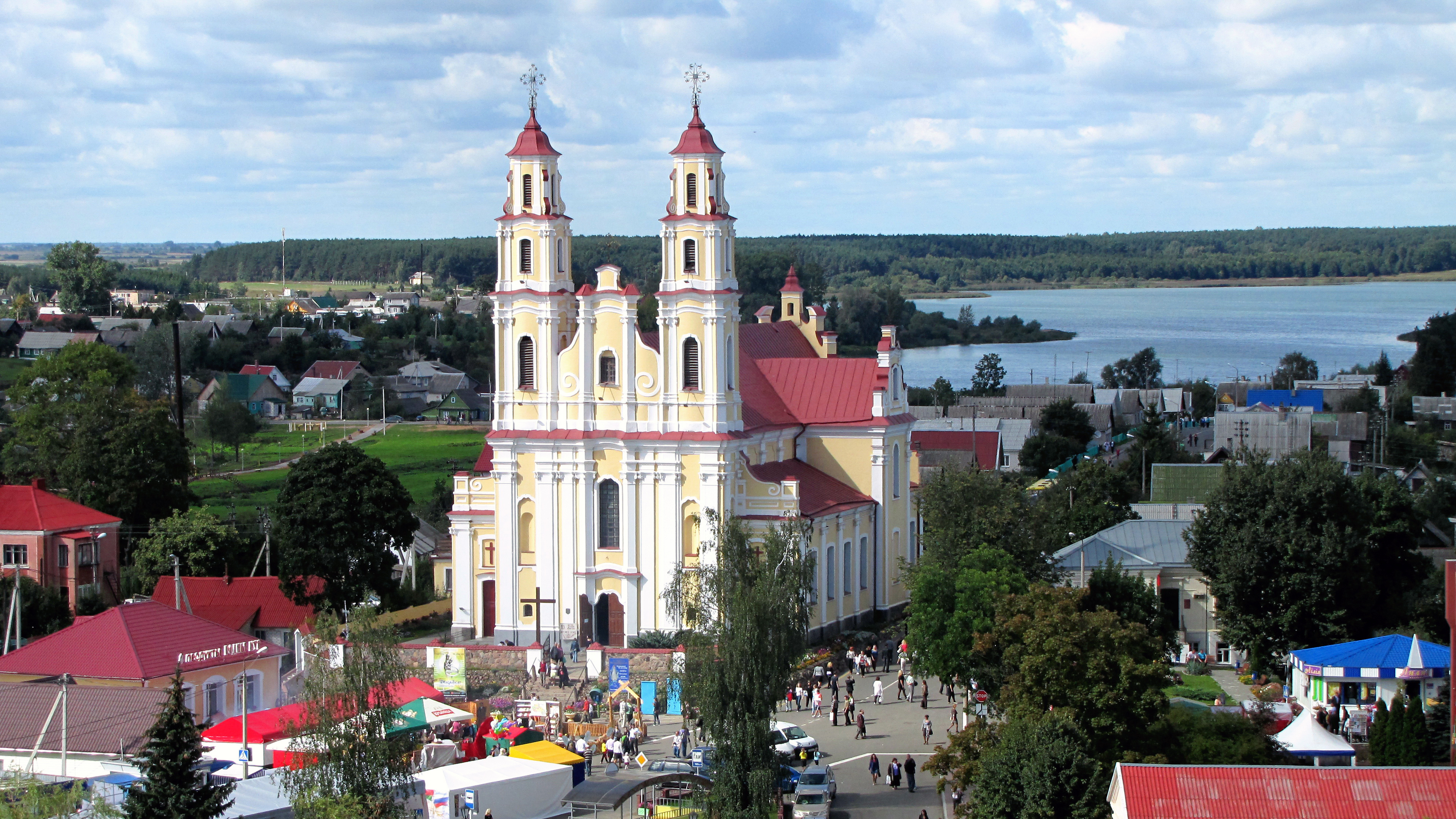
- View of Hlybokaye with the Baroque Holy Trinity church

- Flag Coat of arms

- Location within Belarus
- Coordinates: 55°08′N 27°41′E
- Country: Belarus
- Region: Vitebsk Region
- District: Hlybokaye District

Population (2025)
  - Total: 17,807
- Time zone: UTC+3 (MSK)
- Postal code: 211791, 211792, 211800
- Area code: +375 2156
- License plate: 2
- Website: glubokoe.vitebsk-region.gov.by

Hlybokaye or Glubokoye (Note: Belarusian: Глыбокае, romanized: Hlybokaje; Russian: Глубокое; Polish: Głębokie; Lithuanian: Glubokas; Yiddish: גלובאָק, romanized: Glubok.) is a town in Vitebsk Region, Belarus. It serves as the administrative center of Hlybokaye District. As of 2025, it has a population of 17,807.

The town is located on the international road from Polotsk to Vilnius with the historic railway line to Woropajewo (Варапаева) completed in 1932 in the interwar Poland (the town was incorporated in 1940 by the Soviet Union after the 1939 invasion of Poland).

Within the city limits there are two smaller lakes: Kahalnaye (Кагальнае) and Grand (Вялікае) from which the Birchwood river originates (Бярозаўка, Brzozówka in Polish). The first written records about the settlement date back to 1514. During World War II in occupied Poland the town's district of Berezwecz was the location of a massacre of up to 2,000–3,000 Polish prisoners by the Soviet NKVD secret police, and during the Nazi occupation from July 1941 to July 1944 several thousand Jews were murdered. As late as 2009 the remains of more than 20 victims probably shot by NKVD after the takeover of the area from Poland were again discovered in a basement of a local church.

== History ==
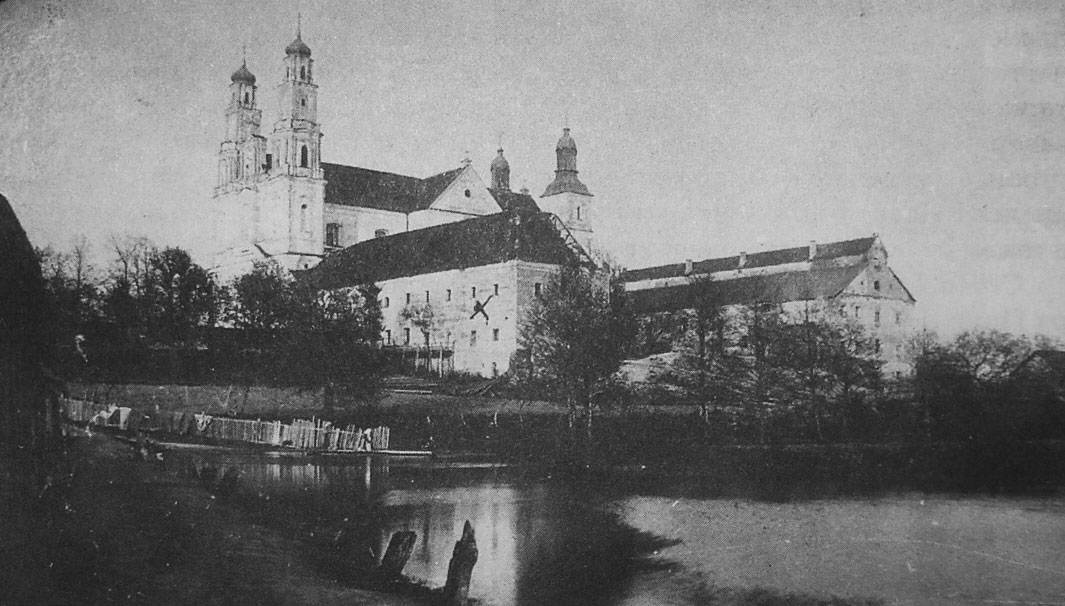
Discalced Carmelites church and monastery in 1892

The first mention of Hlybokaye in historical sources comes from 1414, and this date is considered as the year it was founded. In 1514, Hlybokaye was included in the documents of the Grand Duchy of Lithuania as consisting of a manor house and a property owned by Zianowicz family. It became a private town, administratively located in the Vilnius Voivodeship of the Polish–Lithuanian Commonwealth. In the 17th century, Józef Korsak established a Catholic parish church and a church of the Discalced Carmelites. Korsak put the Discalced Carmelites in charge of running a school and dormitory for poor students. The Discalced Carmelites also ran a library, a pharmacy and a hospital.

Jews first settled in the town in the 17th century, and by the end of the 19th century represented about 70% of the town's 5,600 residents.

Following the Partitions of Poland, the town was annexed by Russia. In 1812, Napoleon stayed at the Discalced Carmelites monastery for several days. The Tsarist authorities closed the monastery of the Discalced Carmelites, and handed it over to the Orthodox church as part of Russification policies. Part of the library was looted, and part was donated to a museum in Vilnius.

=== Second Polish Republic ===
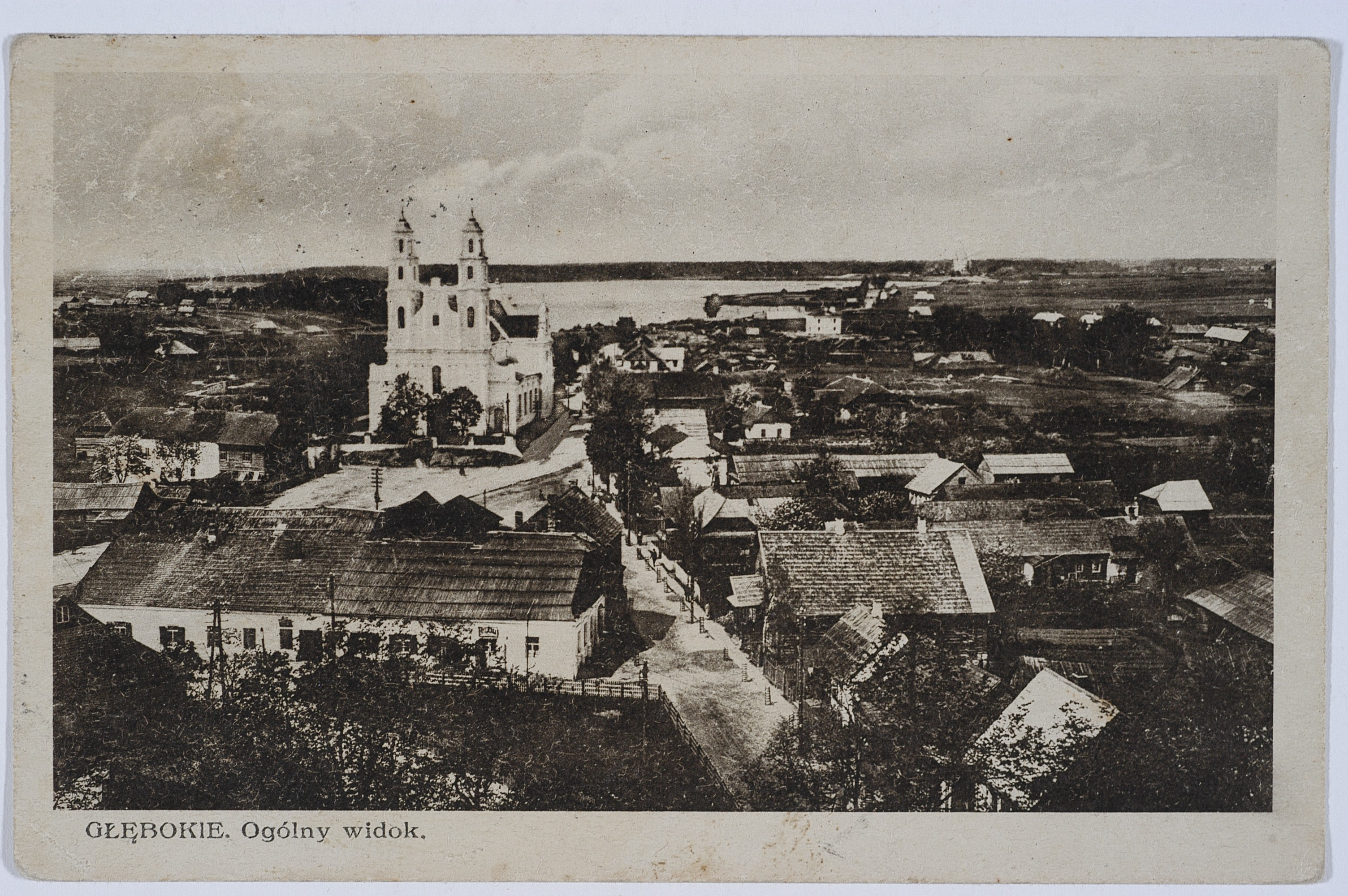
Głębokie in 1930

During Polish-Soviet War of independence, Hlybokaye was taken over by the Polish Army in December 1919, but in July 1920 found itself in the hands of the Bolsheviks as a result of the offensive by Mikhail Tukhachevsky. On 5 July 1920, near Hlybokaye there was a battle in which some 1,500 soldiers died on both sides. In October 1920, the Poles regained the city. The incorporation of Hlybokaye into the Second Polish Republic was officially confirmed by the 1921 Treaty of Riga signed between Poland and the Soviet Union. It was given town status and became the administrative center of the Dziśnieński–Głębokie district and the seat of municipality. On 19 February 1921, Hlybokaye became part of Nowogródek Voivodeship, from 13 April 1922, part of Wilno Land, and on 20 January 1926 part of Wilno Voivodeship. On 10 November 1933, the settlement of Gliniszcza was included within the boundaries of Hlybokaye.

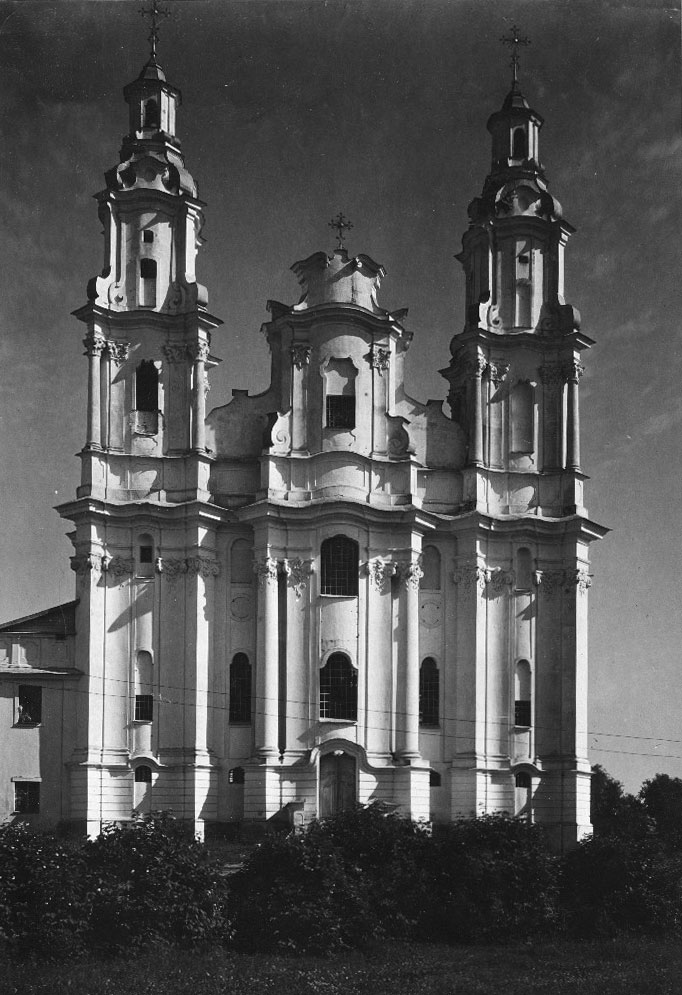
Roman Catholic church in the district of Berezwecz, formerly a separate town where massacres of Polish prisoners of war were conducted by the Soviet NKVD in 1941

According to the Polish census of 1921, some 2,844 Jews lived in Hlybokaye, accounting for 63% of its population. Just before the Soviet invasion of Poland in World War II, Hlybokaye had a population of 9,700. Most residents worked in either, confectionery factory, tannery, mill, county administration, private shops, and warehouses. Every Thursday market was held in the town's centre, and four times a year - country fairs. Also in the town stationed the Polish Border Protection Corps (KOP) regiment.

=== World War II and later ===
As a result of the Soviet invasion of Poland beginning 17 September 1939, the town was taken by the Red Army and on 2 November 1939, incorporated into the Byelorussian SSR of the Soviet Union. It became part of the brand new Vileyka Region on 4 December 1939. Hundreds of Poles were arrested by the NKVD and imprisoned on trumped-up charges. Following the start of Operation Barbarossa on 22 June 1941, the NKVD murdered 1,000-2,000 prisoners, mostly Polish nationals, near Hlybokaye.

Hlybokaye fell under German occupation on 2 July 1941. Shortly thereafter the Germans enacted a number of anti-Jewish laws, including a mandate to seize personal property, and established a Judenrat. Jews of Hlybokaye were relocated into a ghetto on 22 October 1941. Mass killings of Jews began around this time and continued during the German occupation. The largest such event occurred on 19 June 1942, when the Germans, with the help of local collaborators, murdered 2,200 Jews During this time Jews from neighboring communities were resettled in the Hlybokaye ghetto, so the population grew to around 4,000 by the summer of 1943. The Germans began to liquidate the ghetto on 19 August 1943, when inhabitants were told that they were to be sent to the Majdanek concentration camp. An uprising broke out, organized by Jewish anti-Nazi insurgents, which was suppressed by German artillery and air support, including the use of incendiaries that set the town on fire and led to many casualties.

The Germans operated a subcamp of the Stalag 342 prisoner-of-war camp in the town.

At the local Catholic cemetery, are graves of both parents of the famous Polish writer Tadeusz Dołęga-Mostowicz, his father Stefan and mother Stanisława née Popowicz. In 1998, on the back wall of the house (now courthouse) which once belonged to Mostowicz family, a bilingual plaque was laid commemorating the writer.

In July 2009, in the Orthodox Nativity of the Blessed Virgin Mary the council during a work order found the remains faithful to the Poles. Screening is conducted, and the bones were buried, officially because of the odor.

== The flag and coat of arms ==
Hlybokaye's flag and coat of arms were established on 20 January 2006 by Belarusian presidential ukase No. 36

== Monuments ==
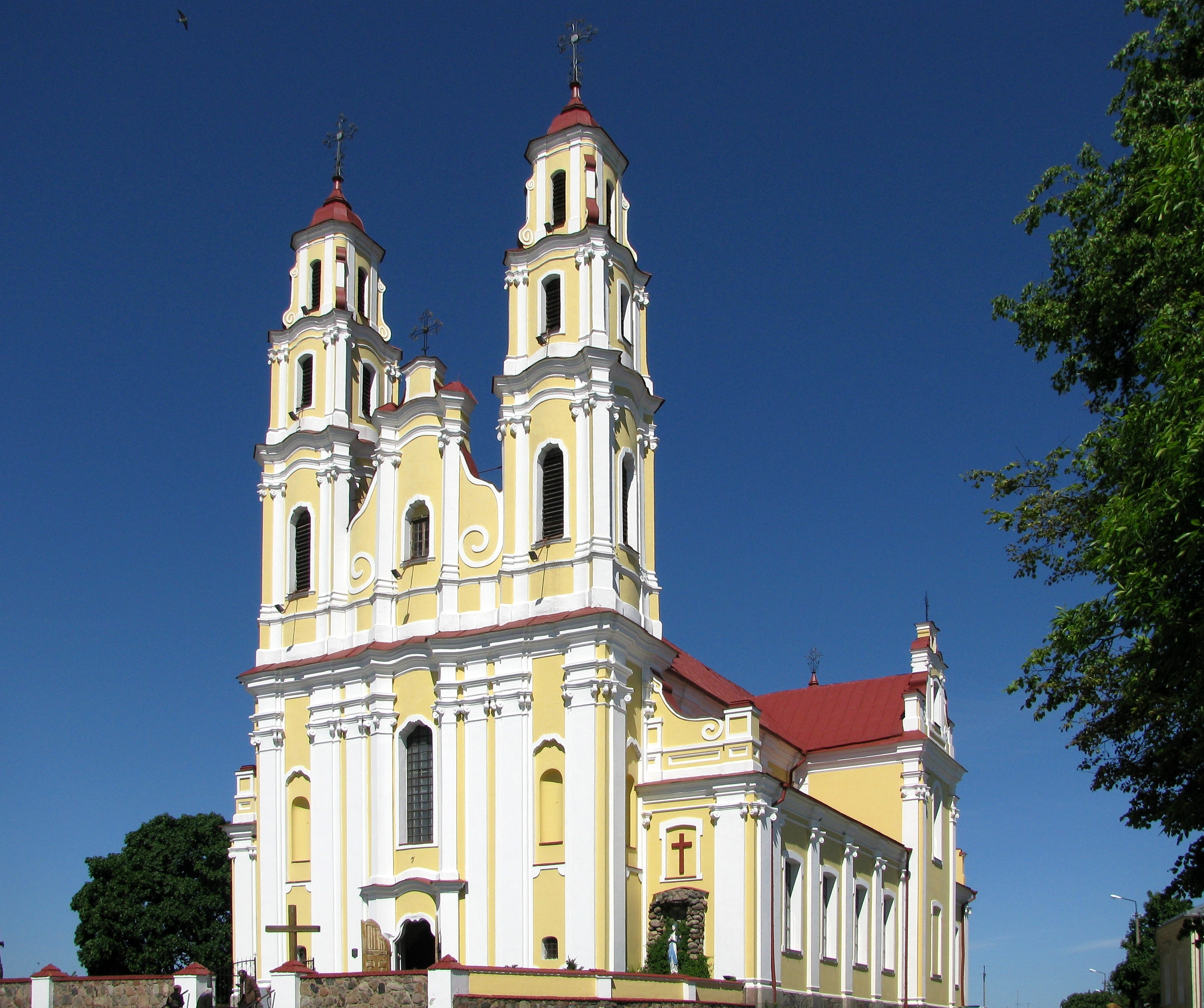
Holy Trinity church

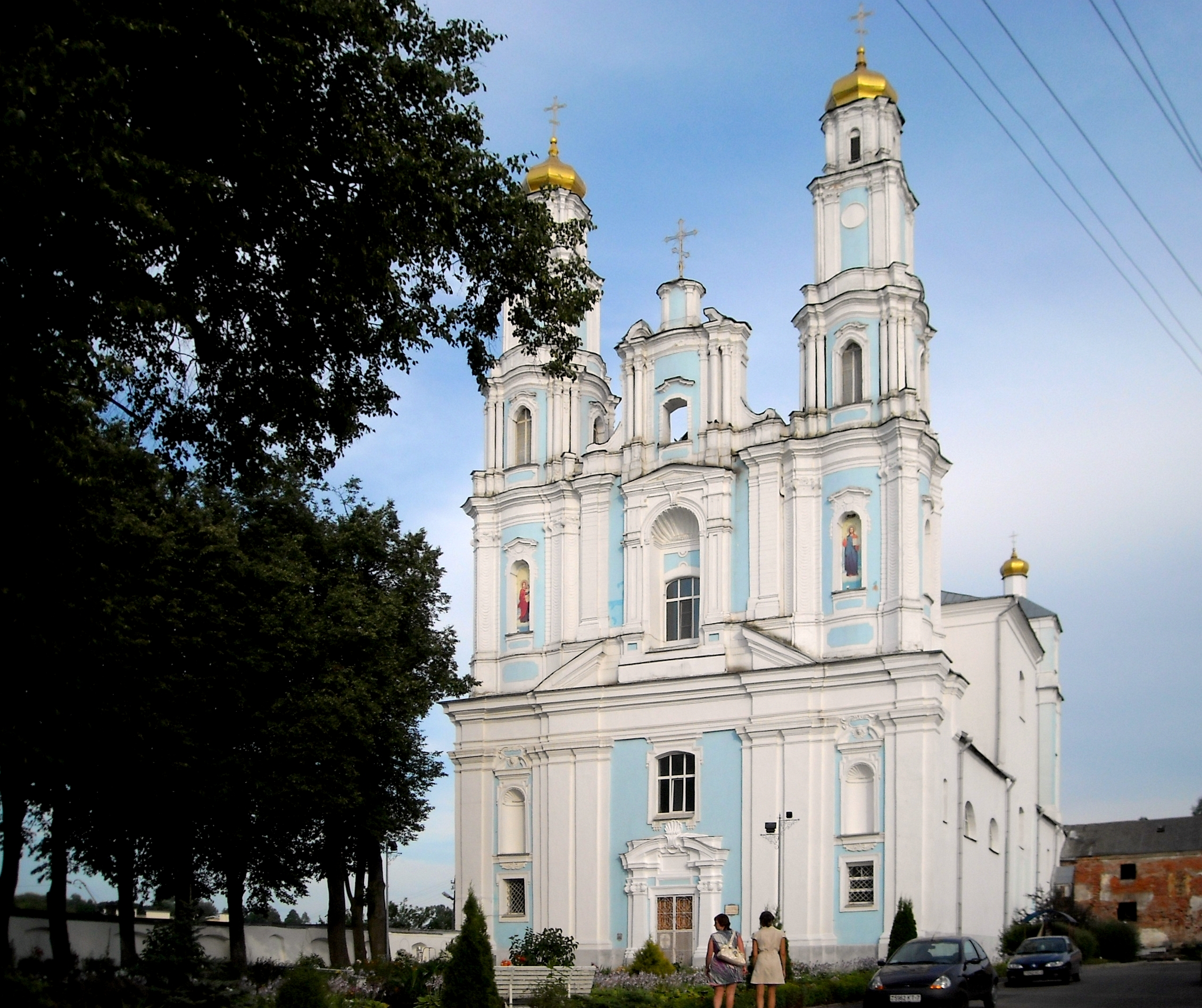
Cathedral of the Nativity

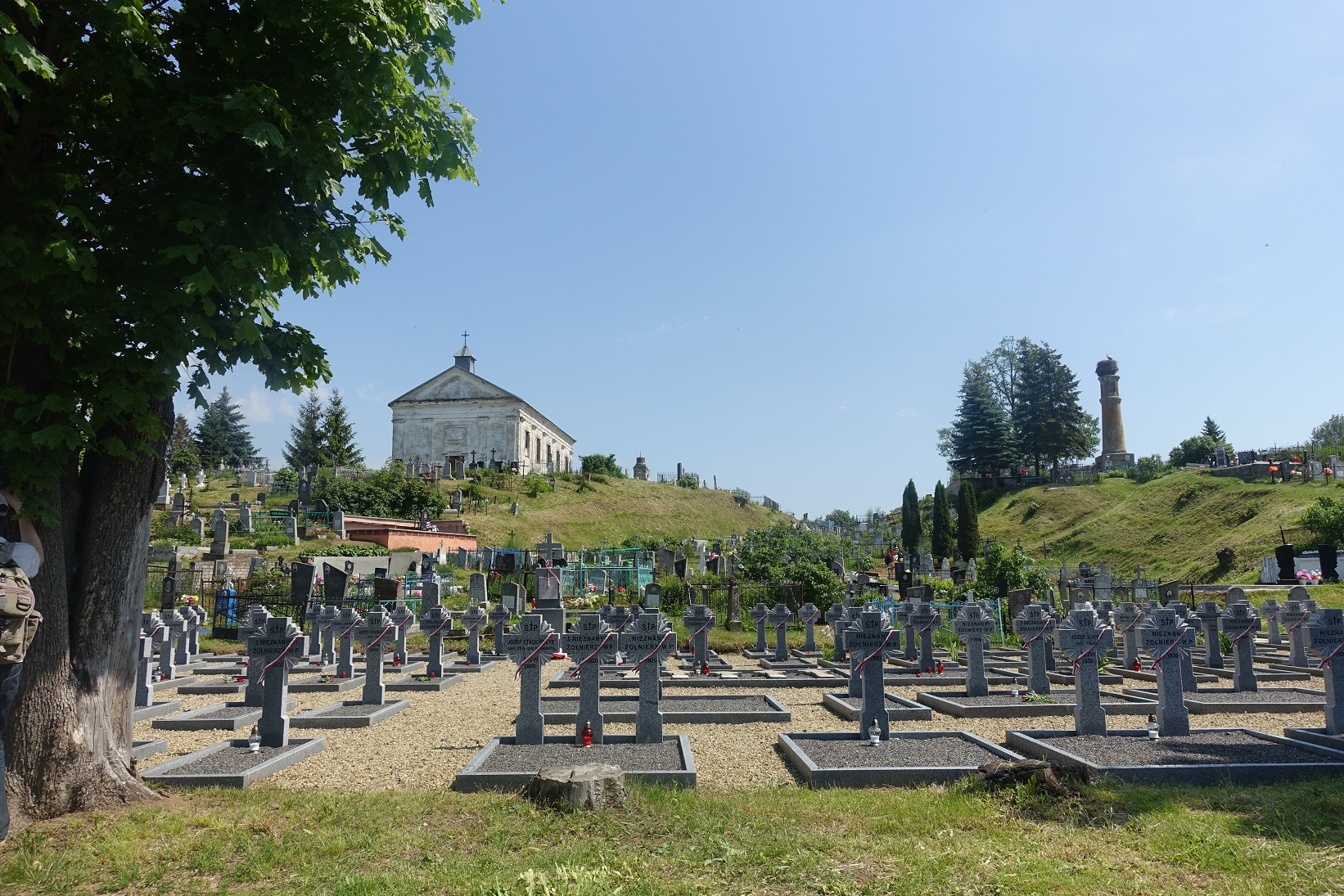
Cemetery with the Saint Elijah chapel and Column of the Constitution of 3 May 1791 in the background, and the Polish military quarter in the foreground

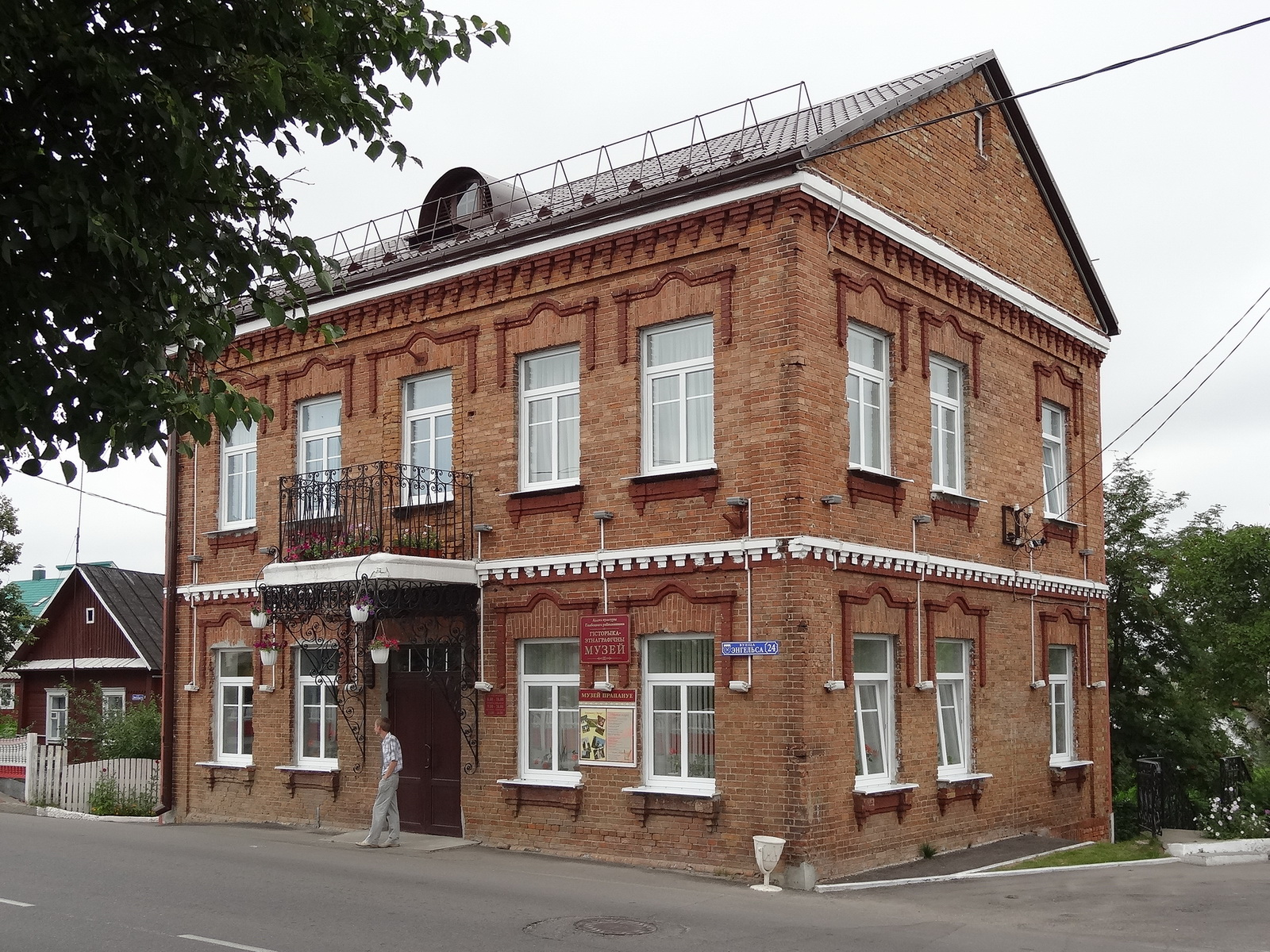
Historical and Ethnographic Museum

- Church of the Holy Trinity, Catholic church founded by voivode Józef Korsak in 1628; one of the few Catholic churches in what is now Belarus active continuously in operation since the foundation.
- Cathedral of the Nativity of the Virgin, former Discalced Carmelites' Church of the Assumption of the Blessed Virgin Mary (1730-1735).
- Church and Basilian Monastery in Berezwecz. Initially wooden, the Vilnian Baroque brick church was erected in 1756-1767. A Basilian Order church until 1839, it was then converted into an Orthodox monastery in the second half of the 19th century. In the interwar period, the church was restored to Catholics, and the KOP was placed in the monastery, and during World War I the monastery was converted by the NKVD into a prison of Poles. The church was destroyed by the communists in 1970. The remains of the Basilian monastery building now house a prison.
- Chapel Cemetery of Saint Elijah on "Kopciówka", founded in the seventeenth century by Józef Korsak. Formerly administered by the Carmelites, it was rebuilt in c. 1775. In 1865, seized and handed over to the Orthodox Church, it was restored to Catholics in 1921.
- Six houses in Zakopane Style, built or rebuilt in 1920–1930.
- Historical and Ethnographic Museum

=== Destroyed monuments ===
- Radziwiłł Palace, destroyed after 1700, remains demolished in 2005, with a store built in its location.
- Holy Trinity Orthodox church, built in the 17th century, destroyed in 1880.
- Synagogue, built in the 18th century, destroyed after 1941.

== Cemeteries ==
- Cemetery "Kopciówka" - the old cemetery's headstone among other things, Elizabeth de Magnus Jelenski (Kulikowski), 1812–1879, the column commemorating the Constitution of 3 May 1791, military quarter of Polish soldiers who died in the Polish–Soviet War in 1920, and the gate of the former monastery of the Carmelites bare.
- Jewish Cemetery

== Notable people ==
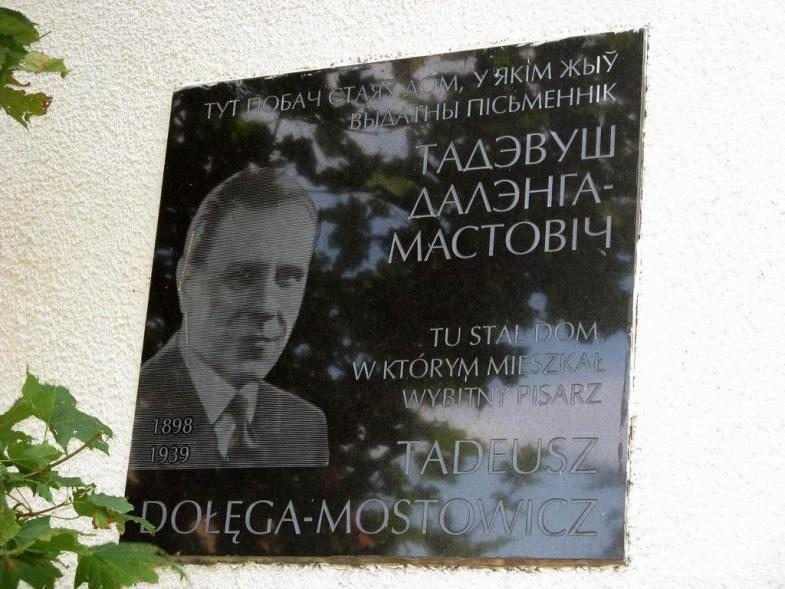
Memorial plaque to writer Tadeusz Dołęga-Mostowicz

- Pavel Sukhoi, Soviet aircraft designer
- Tadeusz Dołęga-Mostowicz, Polish writer, novelist, screenwriter
- Jazep Drazdovič, painter, lived and taught in Hlybokaye for several years
- Klawdziy Duzh-Dushewski (1891 – 1959), Belarusian civil engineer, architect, diplomat and journalist, creator of the white-red-white flag of Belarus in 1917

== Twin towns – sister cities ==
- Daugavpils (municipality), Latvia
- Kiryat Bialik, Israel
- Ludza, Latvia
- Preiļi, Latvia
- Rawicz, Poland
- Švenčionys, Lithuania
- (Georgia (country)) Telavi, Georgia
- Utena, Lithuania
- Viļāni, Latvia
