= Fryderyk Sapieha =

Polish-Lithuanian noble

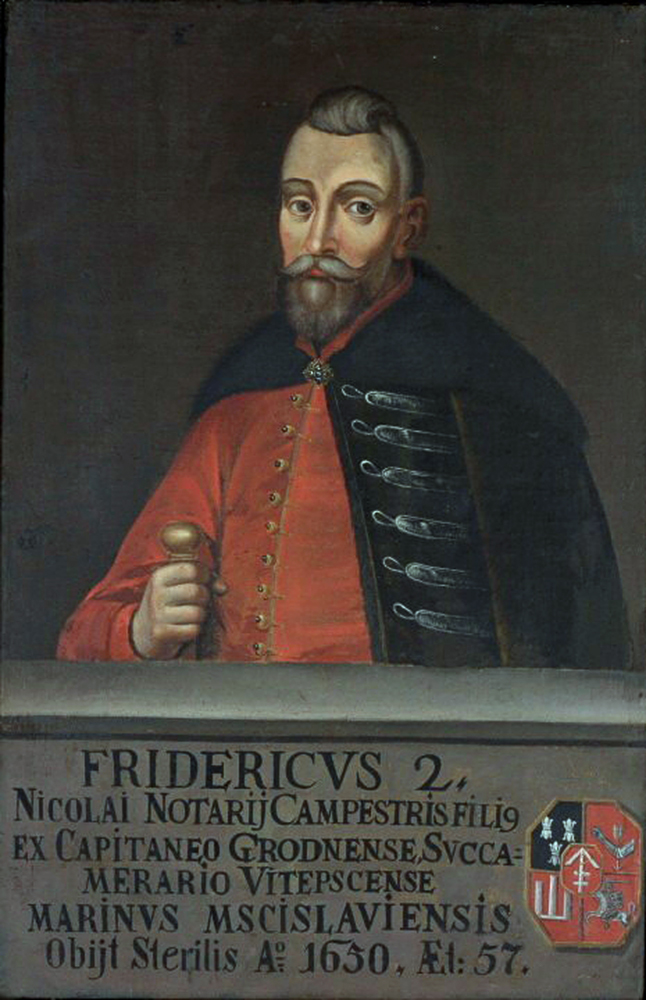
Fryderyk Sapieha

Fryderyk Sapieha (before 1599 - 1650) was a Polish-Lithuanian noble from Polish–Lithuanian Commonwealth. Voivode of Mścisław (1647-1650), podkomorzy of Vitebsk (from 1620), starost of Ostryń (from 1611). Studied in Vilnius and Ingolstadt. Deputy to Sejm in 1624. Fought in the Polish-Swedish War (1625–1629) and Smolensk War with Muscovy (1633-1634).

== Early life ==
He was a son of Mikołaj Sapieha and a member of the Kodeń line of the Sapieha magnate family. The lineage is recorded in genealogical works on Lithuanian–Ruthenian princely and noble houses, which trace the family’s estates and political influence in the eastern territories of the Polish–Lithuanian Commonwealth.

== Career ==
Sapieha is recorded as starost of Ostryń in the early 17th century and as podkomorzy (chamberlain) of Vitebsk by 1620. In 1647, he was appointed voivode of Mścisław, a post he held until his death in 1650.

== Death ==
Sapieha died in 1650 while serving as Voivode of Mścisław.
