= Vilnian Baroque =

Baroque architectural style

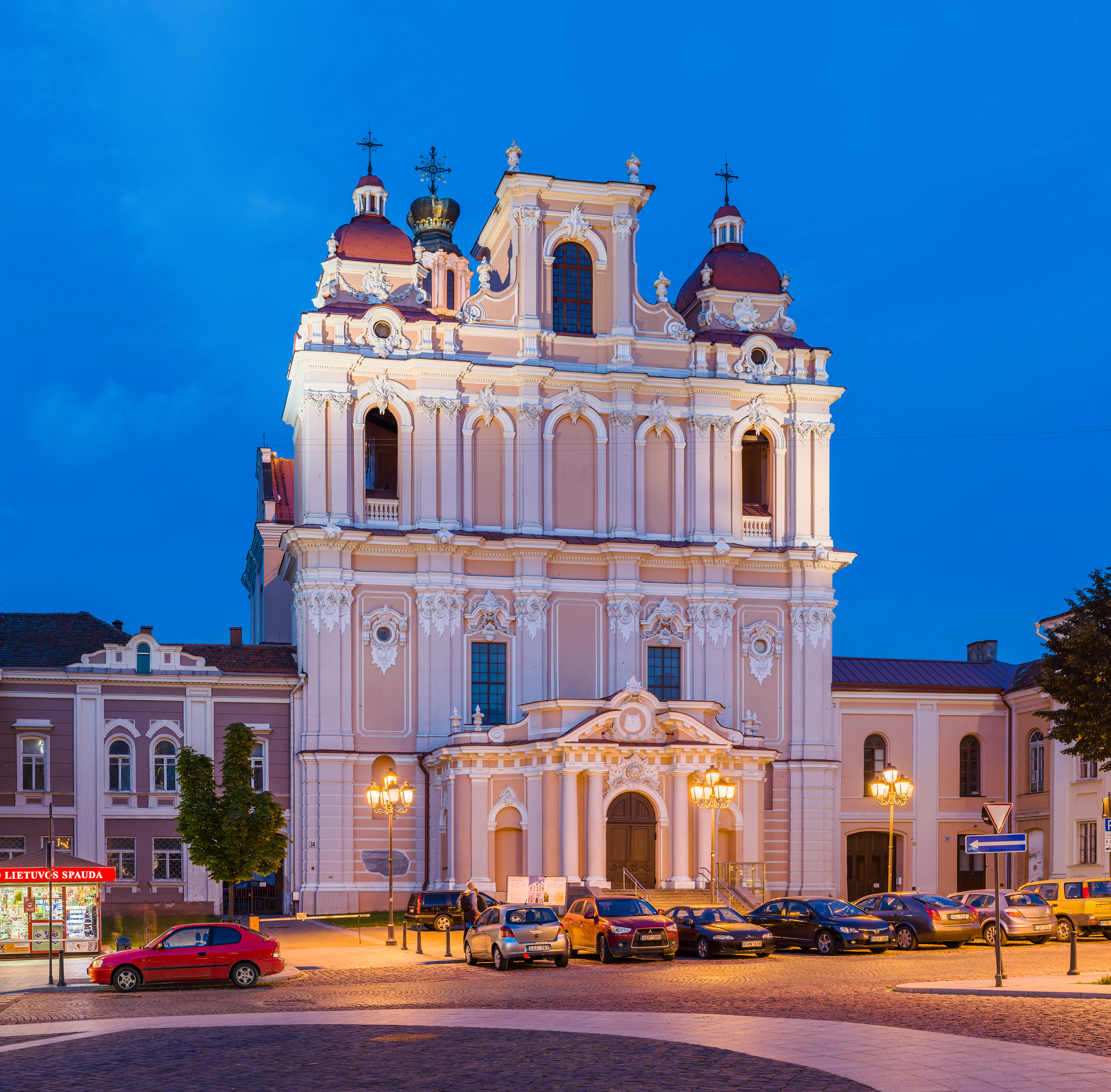
Church of St. Casimir, the first Baroque style church in Lithuania's capital Vilnius

The Vilnian Baroque (Lithuanian: Vilnietiškas barokas, Polish: barok wileński) or the School of Vilnius Baroque (Lithuanian: Vilniaus baroko mokykla, Polish: wileńska szkoła baroku) is a name of late Baroque architecture style in Catholic church architecture of the Grand Duchy of Lithuania, which expanded well into Greek Catholic church architecture on territories covered by the Union of Brest. The style was formed by alumnus of the Catholic Jesuits' Vilnius University. Most preserved buildings in this style are in Vilnius.

The architect Johann Christoph Glaubitz is considered one of the founders of Vilnian Baroque. Working on the restoration of churches in Vilnius, he was often inspired by contemporary buildings of Austria and Bavaria. Polish churches created by Paolo Fontana are also made in Vilnian Baroque style. Although being predominantly Catholic style of architecture, Vilnian Baroque was also popular among the Uniates, which gave the style its second name ‘Uniate Baroque’. Another famous architect Thomas Zebrowski also designed and supervised constructions of Vilnian Baroque churches in Lithuania and Belarus.

A notable style of Baroque architecture emerged in the 18th century with the work of Johann Christoph Glaubitz, who was assigned to rebuild the Grand Duchy of Lithuania's capital of Vilnius. The style was therefore named Vilnian Baroque, and Old Vilnius was named the "City of Baroque". The most notable buildings by Glaubitz in Vilnius are the Church of St. Catherine started in 1743, the Church of the Ascension started in 1750, the Church of St. Johns, the monastery gate and the towers of the Church of the Holy Trinity. The magnificent and dynamic Baroque facade of the formerly Gothic Church of St. Johns is mentioned among his best works. Many church interiors including that of the Great Synagogue of Vilna were reconstructed by Glaubitz as well as the Town Hall built in 1769. The best example of Vilnian Baroque in other places is the Saint Sophia Cathedral in Polotsk, which was reconstructed between 1738 and 1765.

Vilnian Baroque is characterized by an upward striving outlook, two towers, symmetry, and the overall lightness of shapes. In this regard the style is opposed to the Sarmatian style Sarmatian that was widespread in the Grand Duchy of Lithuania in the late XVII — early XVIII centuries. Other features of the Vilnian Baroque include differently decorated compartments, undulation of cornices and walls, decorativeness in bright colors, and multi-colored marble and stucco altars in the interiors.

== Monuments of Vilnian Baroque by country ==
=== Lithuania ===
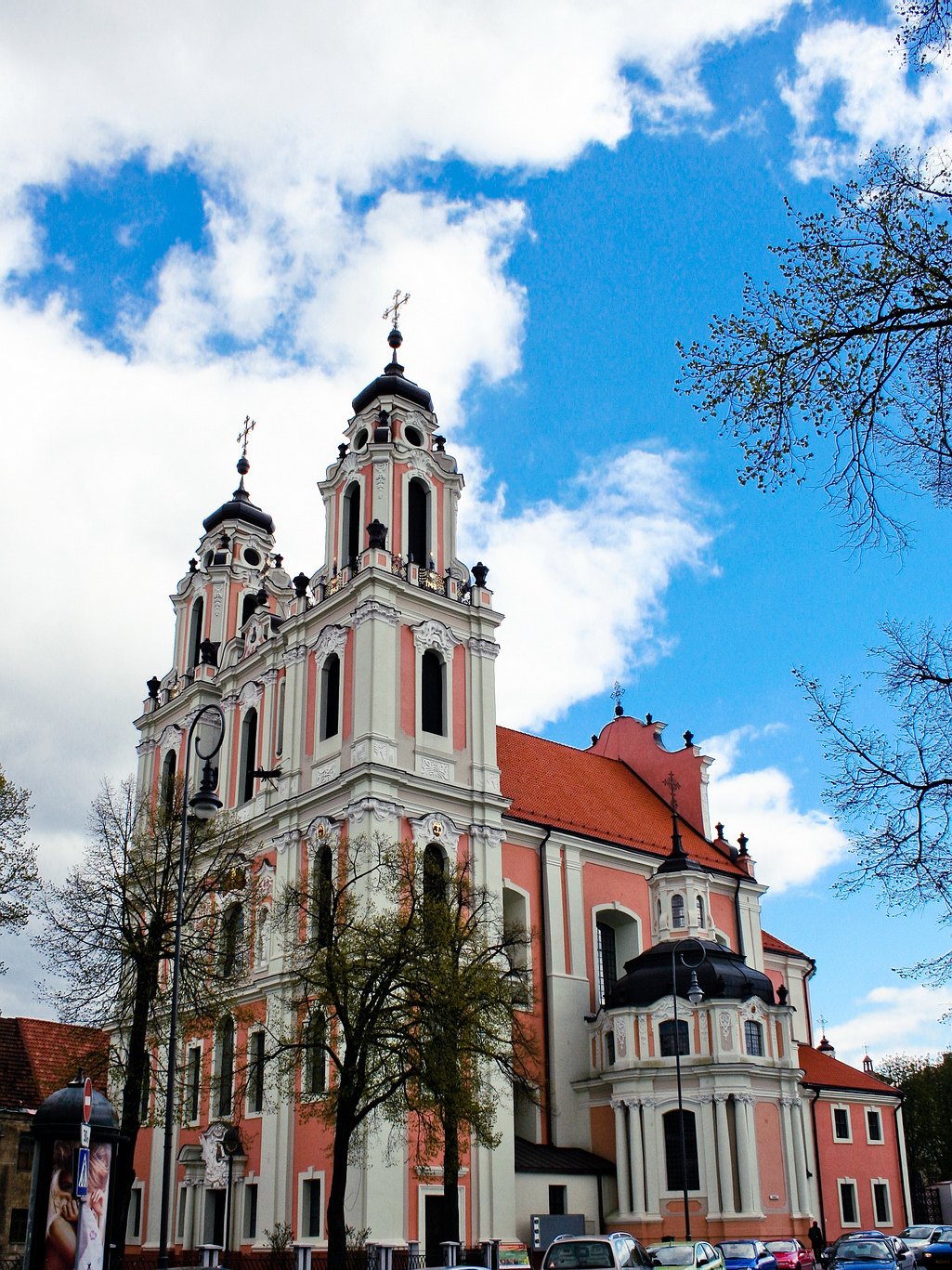
Church of St. Catherine

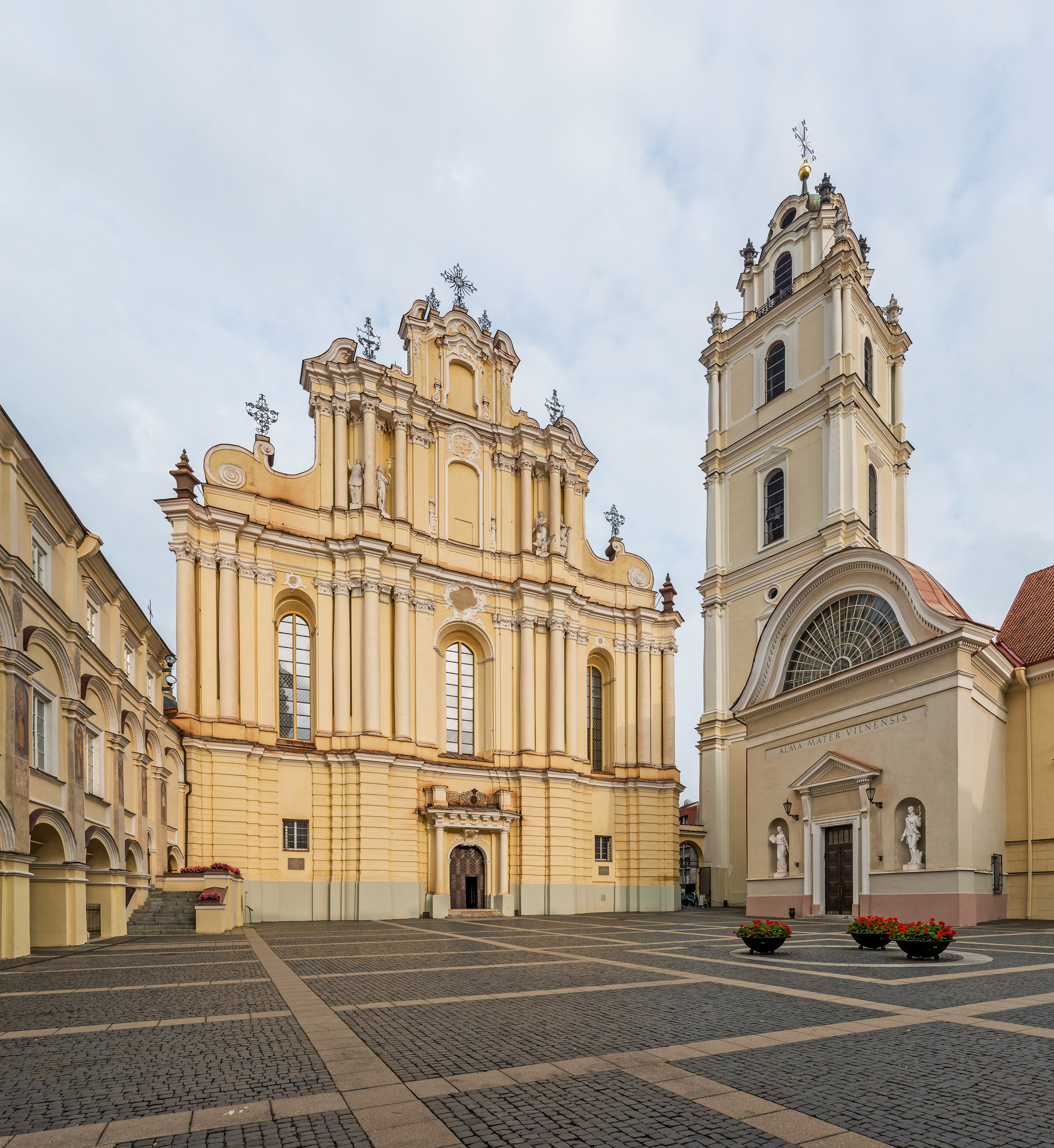
Church of St. Johns

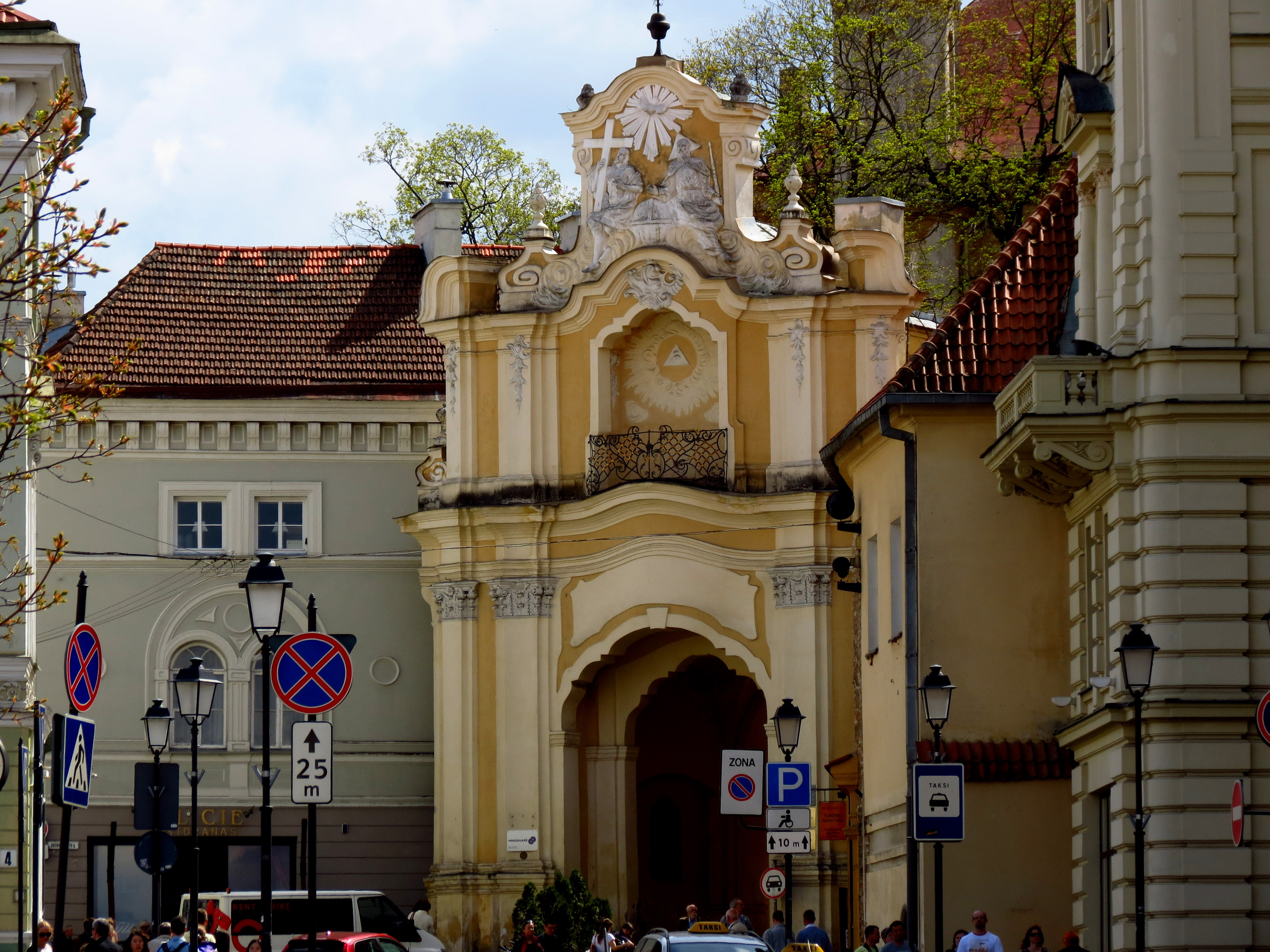
Gates of the Monastery of the Holy Trinity

Vilnius

- Church of the Blessed Virgin Mary of Consolation in Vilnius;
- Church of St. Catherine;
- Church of St. Casimir;
- Church of Ascension in Vilnius;
- Church of Holy Trinity in Trinapolis;
- Church of the Discovery of the Holy Cross
- Church of Jesus the Redeemer;
- Church of the Holy Cross in Vilnius;
- Church of St. Raphael the Archangel;
- Church of All Saints;
- Dominican Church of the Holy Spirit;
- Church of St. Johns;
- Church of the Sacred Heart of Jesus in Vilnius;
- Church of St. Philip and St. Jacob;
- Orthodox Church of the Holy Spirit;
- Orthodox Church of St. Nicholas;
- Church of St. George in Vilnius;
- Gates of the Monastery of the Holy Trinity;
- Church of St. Peter and St. Paul;
- Church of St. Theresa.

Kaunas

- Church of St. Francis Xavier;
- Pažaislis Monastery;

Kražiai

- Church of the Immaculate Conception of Saint Virgin Mary.

=== Belarus ===
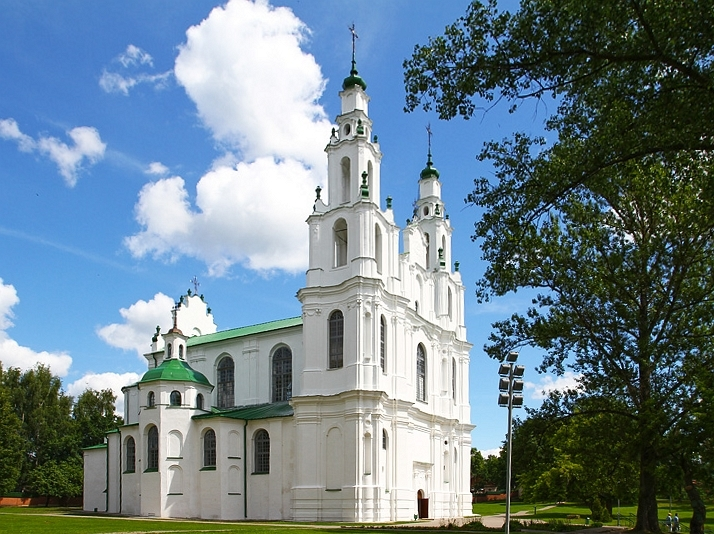
Saint Sophia Cathedral

- Saint Sophia Cathedral in Polotsk;
- Church of Protection of the Holy Virgin in Talačyn;
- Zhyrovichy Monastery;
- Church of the Assumption in Viciebsk;
- Cathedral of the Nativity of the Virgin, Hlybokaye

=== Ukraine ===
- Pochayiv Lavra;
- Transfiguration Cathedral, Vinnytsia.
- Buchach Monastery.

=== Latvia ===
- Basilica of the Assumption in Aglona;
- St Dominic's Church in Pasiene;
- Jesuit Church in Ilūkste.

== Sources ==
- Gabrus, T. V. (2015). Носьбіты ідэалогіі сарматызму [Sarmatian Baroque]. Minsk: Пытанні мастацтвазнаўства, этналогіі і фалькларыстык. p. 24.
- Morozova, Svetlana (2007). Виленское барокко [Vilnian Baroque]. Grodno: Гродзенскі дзяржаўны універсітэт імя Янкі Купалы.
- Raugalienė, J. (2011). Vilniaus architektūros stiliai (PDF) (in Lithuanian). Vilnius: Vilniaus senamiesčio atnaujinimo agentūra. p. 32-40.
- Gabrus, T. (1996). Асаблівасці архітэктуры уніяцкіх храмаў слонімскага рэгіёна ў кантэксце віленскага барока [Uniates churches in Slonim region as examples of Vilnian Baroque]. Наш Радавод. p. 361-364.
