= Józef Korsak =

Polish noble (1590–1643)

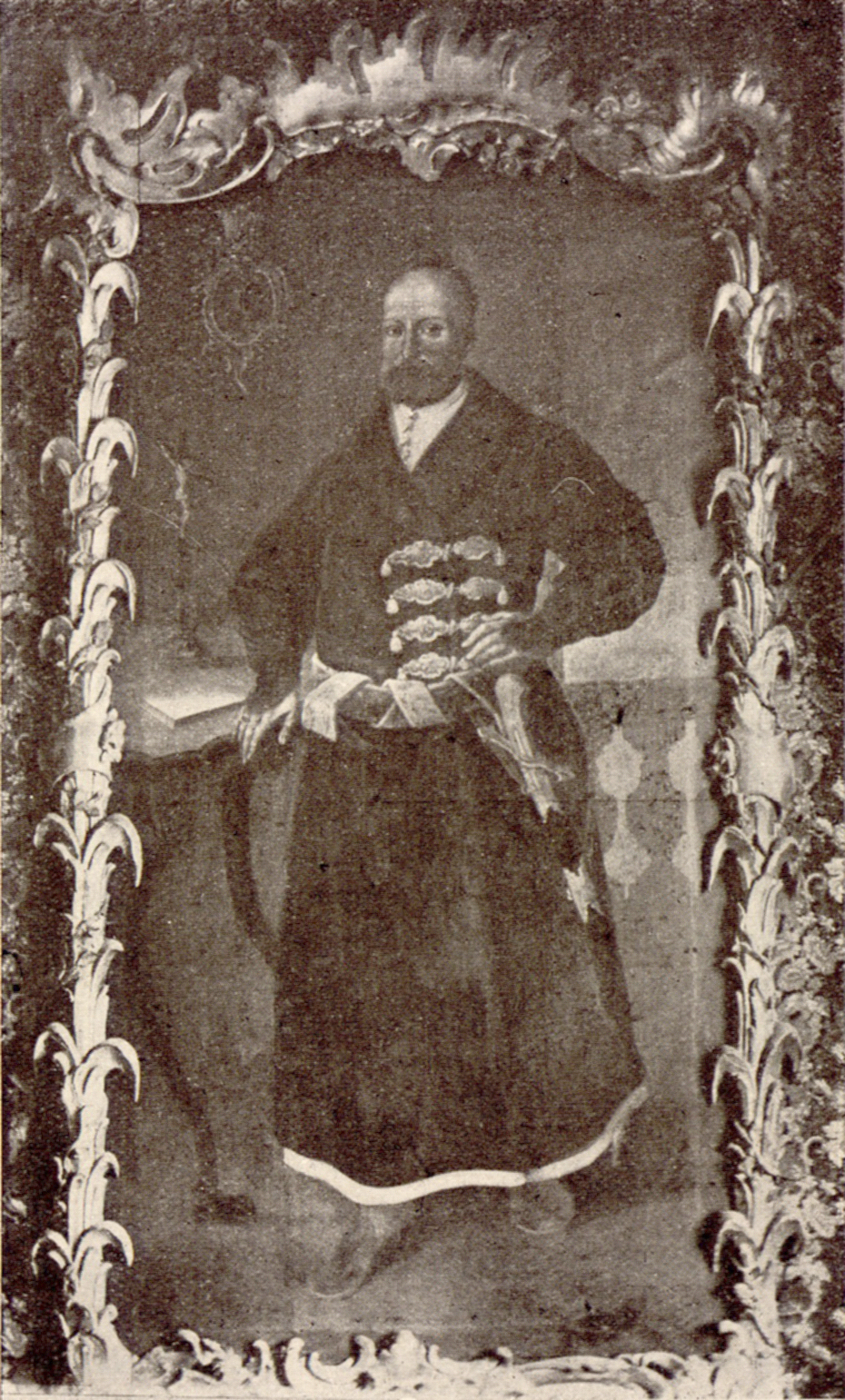
Jozef Korsak Glubotsky(1590–1643)

Jozef Korsak Glubotsky (Polish: Józef Korsak Głębocki, 1590–1643) was a mayor and the governor of Mstsislaw Voivodeship.

== Biography ==
Jozef Glubotsky came from Korsak family, one of the oldest and richest in the Principality of Polotsk, and later in the Grand Duchy of Lithuania and the Polish–Lithuanian Commonwealth. Korsak was the son of Leo and Marianne Podbipenty. He received a good education and owned Latin and several European languages. Korsak was member of the Polish–Muscovite War (1605–18). He distinguished himself in the army of Sigismund III Vasa at the time of the Battle of Smolensk in 1610, in 1617 he took part in the march of Władysław IV Vasa to Moscow. In 1623 he was distinguished for service to the king, granted Disnensk eldership and more later - Kurilovsky and Filippovskaya eldership. In 1626, for military service he was sent as a gift to the Antonov in Mazyr Powiat. In 1633, during the Smolensk War, at its own expense he equipped a troop of soldiers, with whom defended Disnensky lock. Since 1634 Korsak was elder and the first Mstislavl Bailiff, in 1639, he was appointed commander of the Mstsislaw Voivodeship. Being Orthodox, under the influence of his cousin, Polotsk Uniate Metropolitan Rafajil Korsak he converted to Uniate Church. In 1628 Jozef Korsak founded the church of the Holy Trinity (current and ongoing) in Hlybokaye, Belarus and in 1638 the monastery of the Uniate Basilian Order and in 1639 the church and convent of the Order of Discalced Carmelites in the same city. Construction of the Carmelite church, to which he devoted special attention, began immediately, being in 1639 under the personal guidance of Ktitor. In the summer of 1643 Jozef Korsak died suddenly, being childless, having to confirm his will in which Carmelites received possession of the place in Hlybokaye, 26 villages, folwark, mills and forests. He was buried in the crypt of the Cathedral of the Nativity of the Virgin Mary where the remains were dumped here in the second half of the 19th century when Russian government made this church an orthodox one.

== Sources ==
- Tadeusz Wasilewski. Józef Korsak / / Polski Słownik Biograficzny. - T. XIV. - 1968–1969. - S. 108.
- Вячаслаў Насевіч. Корсакі / / Энцыклапедыя гісторыі Беларусі. У 6 т. Т. 4: Кадэты - Ляшчэня / Беларус. Энцыкл.; Рэдкал.: Г. П. Пашкоў (галоўны рэд). І інш.; Маст. Э. Э. Жакевіч. - Мн.: БелЭн, 1997. С. 239th.
- Corsacs / / The Golden Horde: The Encyclopedia . In 3 volumes Volume 2: Cadet Corps - Jackiewicz / Editorial Board.: GP Paschke (gal.red.) And others.; Sett. ZE Gerasimov. - Mn.: BelEn 2006. -792 C: Il. S. 650. ISBN 985-11-0315-2, ISBN 985-11-0378-0 (v. 2)
- Encyclopedia. At 6 vols 4: The Cadets - Leschenya / Belarusian. Encyclopedia.; Editorial Board.: GP PASHKOV (Chief Ed.) And others.; Sett. EE Zhakevich. - Mn.: BelEn, 1997. - 432 p.: Il. ISBN 985-11-0041-2.
- Vyacheslav Nosevich. Corsacs / / Encyclopedia of History of Belarus . At 6 vols 4: The Cadets - Leschenya / Belarusian. Encyclopedia.; Editorial Board.: GP PASHKOV (Chief Ed.) And others.; Sett. EE Zhakevich. - Mn.: BelEn, 1997. S. 239.
- Sergei Roe. Korsak Raphael / / The Golden Horde: The Encyclopedia. The 3 tons / red. GP Pasha and others. Volume 2: Cadet Corps - Jackiewicz. - Minsk: Belarusian Encyclopedia, 2005. S. 649.
