= Mstsislaw Voivodeship =

Voivodeship of the Grand Duchy of Lithuania

Coordinates: 54°01′05″N 31°43′32″E

Mstislaw Voivodeship Województwo Mścisławskie Mstislavlio vaivadija
- Voivodeship of the Grand Duchy of Lithuania, later Polish–Lithuanian Commonwealth
- 1566–1772
- Flag Coat of arms

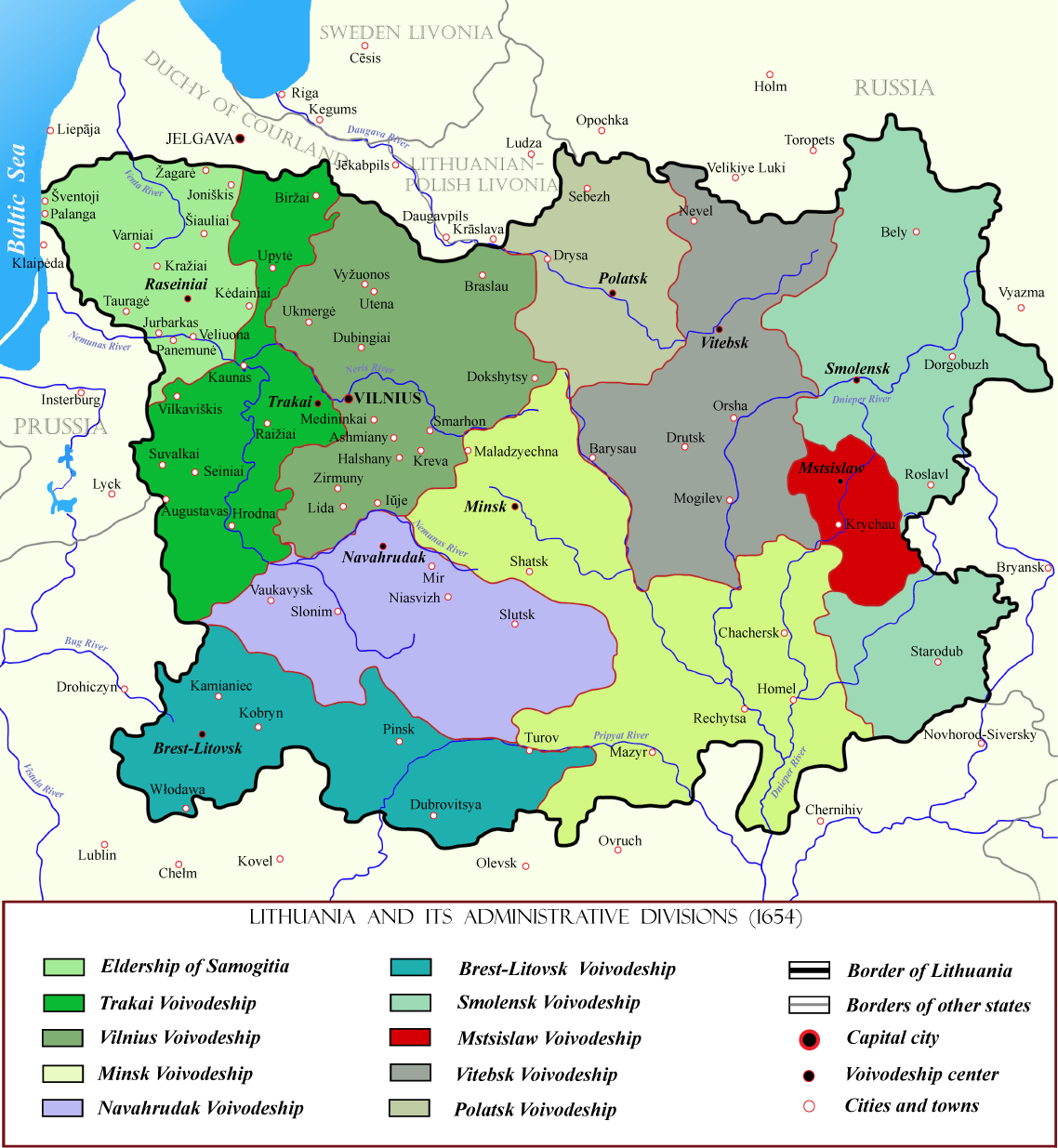
- Mstislaw Voivodeship in red. Voivodeship's borders did not change since the Union of Lublin.
- Mścisław Voivodeship in the Polish–Lithuanian Commonwealth
- Capital: Mstislaw
- Area
- 22,600 km^{2} (8,700 sq mi)
- History
  - Established: 1566
  - First partition of the Polish–Lithuanian Commonwealth: 1772
- Political subdivisions: none
Preceded by	Succeeded by
Duchy of Lithuania	Russian Empire

Mstislaw Voivodeship or Mścisław Voivodeship (Belarusian: Амсьціслаўскае ваяводзтва, romanized: Amścisławskaje vajavodztva; Polish: Województwo Mścisławskie; Lithuanian: Mstislavlio vaivadija; Latin: Palatinatus Mscislaviensis) was a unit of administrative division and local government in the Grand Duchy of Lithuania (from 1569 the Polish–Lithuanian Commonwealth), since the 15th century until the Partitions of Poland in 1795.

Zygmunt Gloger in his book Historical Geography of the Lands of Old Poland (Polish: Geografia historyczna ziem dawnej Polski) provides this description of the Mscislaw Voivodeship:

Mscislaw (Mscislavia), which lies at the Wiechra river, was probably founded in the late 13th century, and named after Duke of Smolensk, Mstislav Romanovich the Old. In the 14th century, it was captured by the Grand Duchy of Lithuania, and for a while remained a fief (...) By 1538, the Duchy of Mscislaw was already governed by a starosta, who during the reign of King Zygmunt August was renamed into a voivode, while the Duchy was turned into a voivodeship. First Voivode of Mscislaw was Jerzy Oscik, Traby coat of arms. (...) The Voivodeship of Mscislaw was not divided into counties (see powiat). Its sejmiks took place at Mscislaw, where two deputies to the Sejm were elected, and two to the Lithuanian Tribunal (...) It ceased to exist in 1772, when after the first partition of Poland, Mscislaw Voivodeship was annexed by the Russian Empire.

Voivodeship Governor (Wojewoda) seat:

- Mścisław

== Voivodes ==
- Janusz Skumin Tyszkiewicz (1621-1626)
- Mikołaj Kiszka (1626-1636)
- Krzysztof Kiszka (1636–1639)
- Józef Korsak (1639–1643)
- Mikołaj Abramowicz (1643-1647)
- Fryderyk Sapieha (VIII 1647–1650)
