= Monastery of the Holy Spirit, Vilnius =

Orthodox monastery in Vilnius, Lithuania

Monastery of the Holy Spirit
- Šventos Dvasios vienuolynas
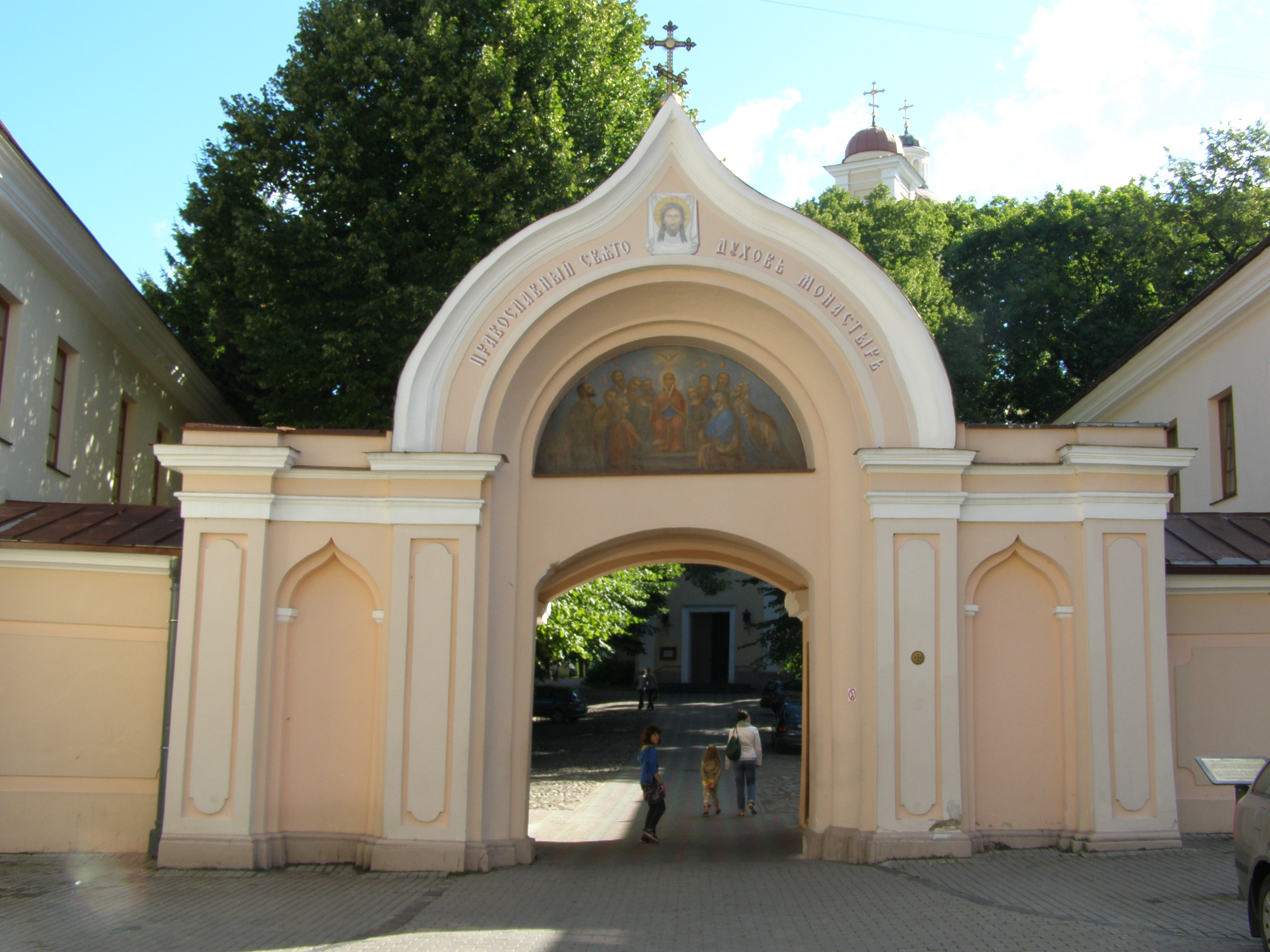
- Gate leading to the monastery grounds

- Location within Lithuania

Monastery information
- Order: Russian Orthodox Church
- Diocese: Russian Orthodox Diocese of Lithuania
- Controlled churches: Orthodox Church of the Holy Spirit

People
- Founders: Theodora and Anna Wołowicz
- Archbishop: Metropolitan Innocent

Architecture
- Style: Vilnian Baroque
- Completed date: 17th century

Site
- Country: Lithuania
- Coordinates: 54°40′32″N 25°17′27″E

The Monastery of the Holy Spirit is an Orthodox monastery in Vilnius that has been continuously operating since 1609. In the Polish–Lithuanian Commonwealth, it was one of the most important centers of Orthodoxy. After the annexation of the Vilnius region to the Russian Empire, the monastery was elevated to a second-rank and then a first-rank monastery. Since 1845, it has served as the residence of the Bishops of Vilnius and Lithuania. Operating legally within the borders of the Second Polish Republic since 1924, it continued its functions without interruption even after Vilnius became part of the Soviet Union. Its church, dedicated to the same invocation as the entire monastery, is a place of special veneration for the Vilnius martyrs – Saints Anthony, John, and Eustathius – whose relics are kept in the main nave of the church.

The monastery occupies a complex of one-story buildings in a courtyard behind an ornate entrance gate at 10 Aušros Vartų Street.

== History ==
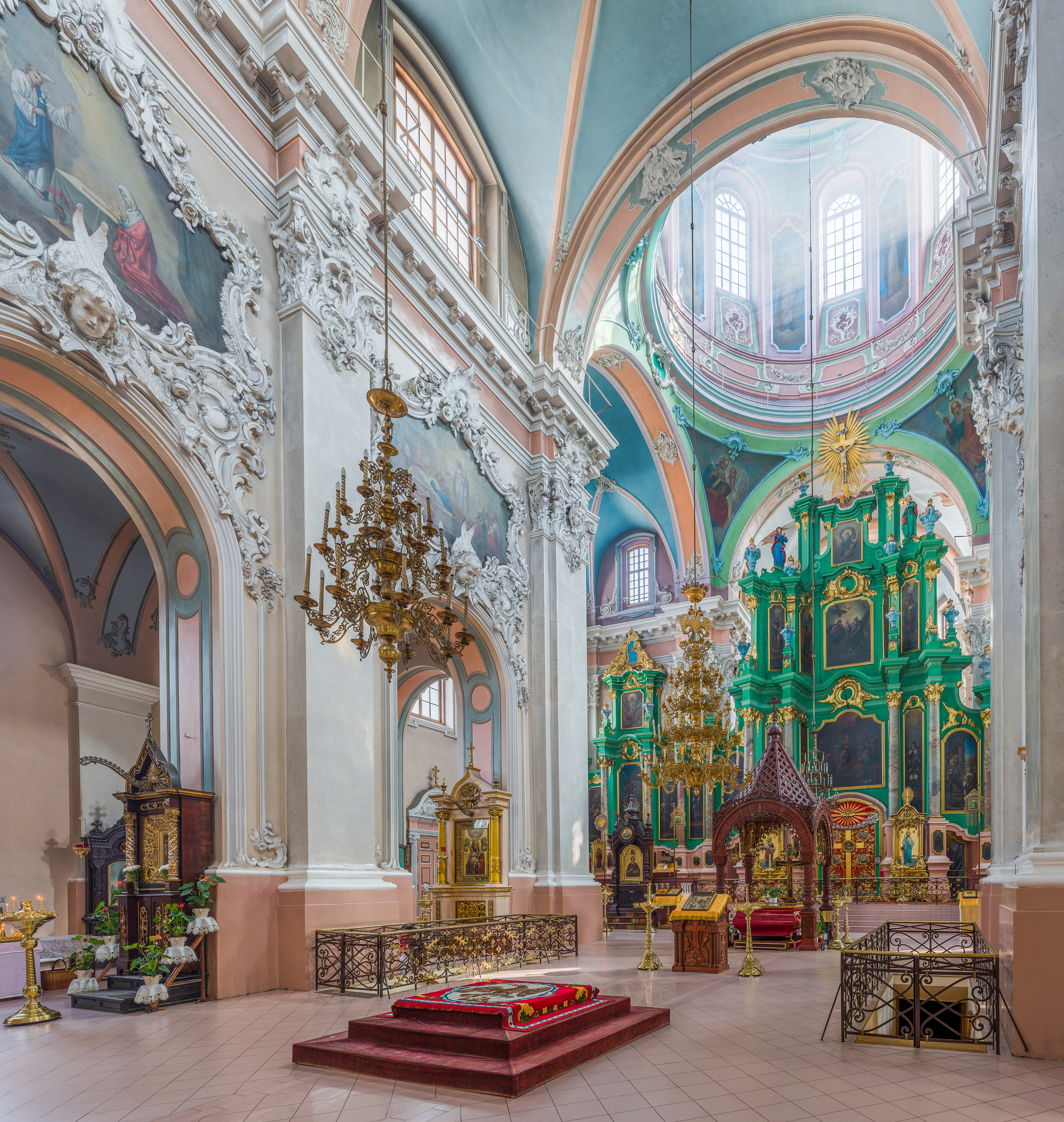
Interior of the Holy Spirit Monastery church viewed towards Rococo iconostasis

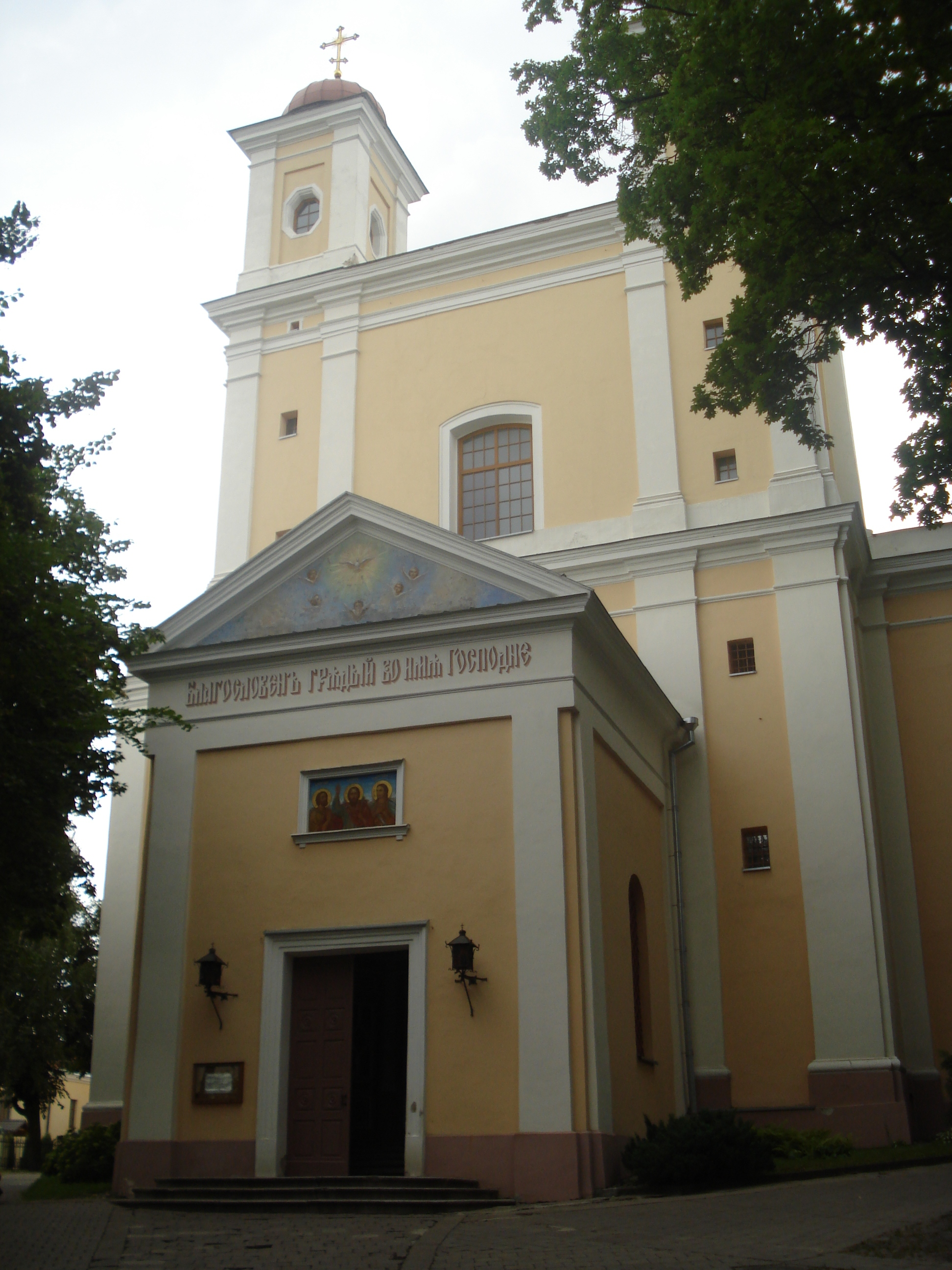
Facade of the church

=== Beginnings ===
The Monastery of the Holy Spirit was established in 1609 by the Orthodox Brotherhood of the Holy Trinity, which subsequently adopted the name Brotherhood of the Holy Spirit. This brotherhood, consisting of several hundred members from both the artisan class and the aristocracy, had been active since 1585. (Note: Brotherhoods in the Jagiellonian state already existed in the 15th century. They were established as economic and religious organizations. They consisted mostly of burghers.) One of its primary goals was to defend Orthodoxy against Catholic influences, actively opposing the Union of Brest. They published numerous theological and polemical works through their own printing press. In 1597, the brotherhood succeeded in obtaining a royal privilege to build a new Orthodox church in Vilnius on land owned by sisters Theodora and Anna Wołowicz. The fact that the property belonged to a noble family ensured that its construction could be completed and that it would not be transferred to the Uniates in subsequent years. This wooden church was erected near the Monastery of the Holy Trinity, to which the brotherhood was connected, and was dedicated to the Holy Spirit.

After the church and Monastery of the Holy Trinity were handed over to the Uniates, the brotherhood relocated its headquarters and printing press (which was soon shut down after publishing another polemical work) to buildings adjacent to the Church of the Holy Spirit. There, they established a male monastery, with Longin Karpowicz, a printer in the brotherhood's workshop who took the monastic name Leoncjusz, becoming its first superior. After his death in 1620, Meletius Smotrytsky, another former brotherhood member, took over the position until he accepted the Union in 1625. The monastery's community was primarily composed of monks who refused to accept the Union and had fled from the Monastery of the Holy Trinity. The monastery sustained itself through the monks' work in the orchard and farm and with support from lay donors, mainly from the noble ranks of the Brotherhood of the Holy Spirit, such as Chamberlain Bogdan Ogiński. After 1611, the associated church was the only active Orthodox church in the city and simultaneously the center of anti-Union opposition. From its inception, by the authority granted by Patriarch Jeremias II of Constantinople, the monastery was stauropegic, directly subordinate to the Ecumenical Patriarch of Constantinople and, after 1686, to the Patriarch of Moscow.

=== From 17th to 18th century ===
At its founding, the monastery was housed in buildings dating from between the 16th and 17th centuries. The monastery complex was accessed through a gate. On the left side of the courtyard was a one-story building housing the living quarters for the superior and deputy of the monastery and the office. A similar building on the right side housed the monks, the refectory, and the kitchen. In the further part of the courtyard was the church. Parallel to the church were two more one-story buildings – the one on the right side of the church housed additional cells for monks and a second refectory, while the one on the left housed an orphanage and cells for the novices. In the further part of the courtyard were the economic facilities – a granary, stables, two cowsheds, and a warehouse. The Brotherhood of the Holy Spirit and the school it organized, known for its high standards and intended as an alternative to Jesuit colleges, operated in adjacent buildings.

By the mid-17th century, the Monastery of the Holy Spirit had become a significant spiritual center, with 19 other, later-established monastic communities under its special protection, including two female monasteries. These included monasteries in Vievis, Minsk, Kupiatycze, Surdegis, Druia, Nevel, Kronie, Cepr, Hrozava, Sielc, Nowy Dwór, Pryłuki, Kiejdany, and Zabłudów. Their founders believed that subordinating newly established monasteries to the well-known and strong Brotherhood of the Holy Spirit monastery would ensure their survival in case of conflict with the Uniates. This network of monasteries was the largest of the three existing in the Polish–Lithuanian Commonwealth. Tomasz Kempa suggests that the connection with the Monastery of the Holy Spirit may have been the reason why most of these monasteries remained Orthodox despite the conversion of their founders and financial benefactors to Byzantine Rite Catholicism.

Monks from the Monastery of the Holy Spirit were appointed as superiors of other monasteries or took bishopric positions. Melecjusz Smotrycki became the Archbishop of Polotsk, and Józef Bobrykowicz became the Bishop of Mstsislaw, Mogilev, and Orsha. The monastery remained one of the main centers of opposition to the Union. For a short period, the future Orthodox saint and strong opponent of the Union, Athanasius of Brest, was a monk there. It was one of two monasteries in the Polish–Lithuanian Commonwealth managed by the diocesan bishop of the respective diocese (in this case, Vilnius) or an archimandrite appointed by the Metropolitan of Kyiv in agreement with the Brotherhood of the Holy Spirit. In other centers – except the Monastery of the Holy Trinity in Slutsk – superiors bore the title of hegumen.

In 1629 and 1637, the monastery was attacked by groups of Union supporters aiming to eliminate the last strong center of disunity on Lithuanian lands. The monks also faced difficulties obtaining permission to build a new brick church, which they eventually received through a privilege granted by King Władysław IV Vasa in 1632. In the same document, the king confirmed the subordination of 17 other monasteries to the superior of the Monastery of the Holy Spirit. The new church was consecrated on 16 April 1634, and according to eyewitness accounts, the event was disrupted by Catholics. In 1648, due to financial difficulties, the monastery's printing press ceased operations, followed a few years later by the school.

In the second half of the century, during the wars of the Polish–Lithuanian Commonwealth with Sweden and Russia, the monastery suffered multiple times from military actions or was looted. It particularly deteriorated during the Battle of Vilnius during the Russo-Polish War. After the Polish forces recaptured Vilnius in 1661, the monks were accused by Vilnius Uniates of collaborating with the Russians, which was unfounded. In reality, the monks feared the arrival of foreign troops and had hidden some church valuables. King John II Casimir Vasa had no doubts about the community's loyalty and confirmed their faithfulness to the Commonwealth in a letter to the city authorities, instructing them to exempt the monastery from military levies due to war losses. In 1677, the monastery was visited by the future Orthodox saint, Demetrius of Rostov. Further destruction occurred during the Great Northern War. The Russian Tsar Peter the Great provided financial assistance for the monastery's reconstruction. From then on, the Russian royal family regularly donated money, icons, and liturgical items to the monastery. The rebuilt buildings, however, survived only 39 years and were almost entirely destroyed in the Vilnius fire of 1749. Reconstruction was possible thanks to financial aid from Russia amounting to 6,000 rubles. The city authorities agreed to the monastery's reconstruction only in 1751, with the condition that the new buildings would not stand out too much among the neighboring structures and that the gate facing the street would not be too richly decorated. The reconstruction was supervised by Johann Christoph Glaubitz, who also crafted a new iconostasis for the monastery church.

=== Within the Russian Empire ===
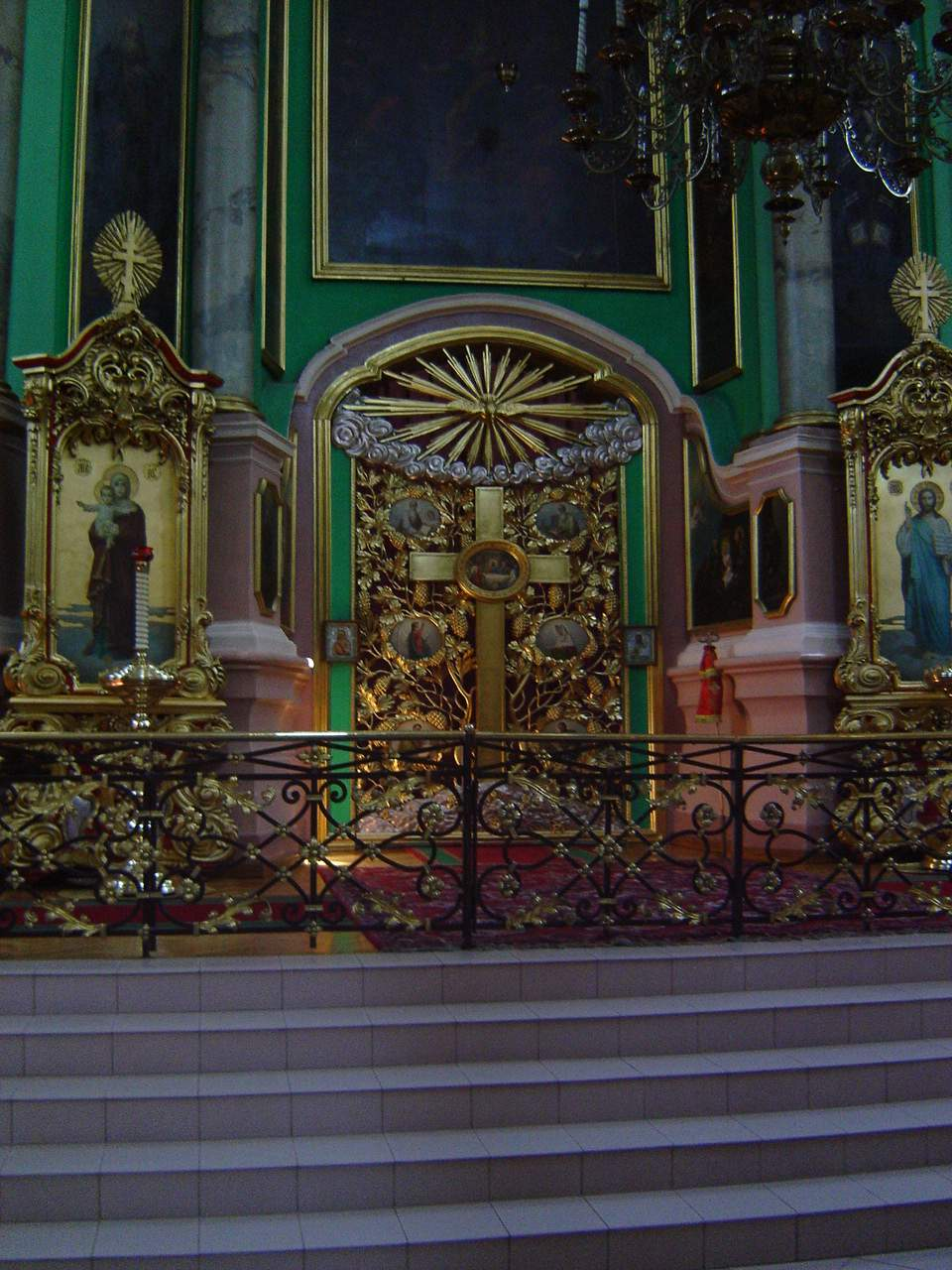
Royal doors in the church's iconostasis

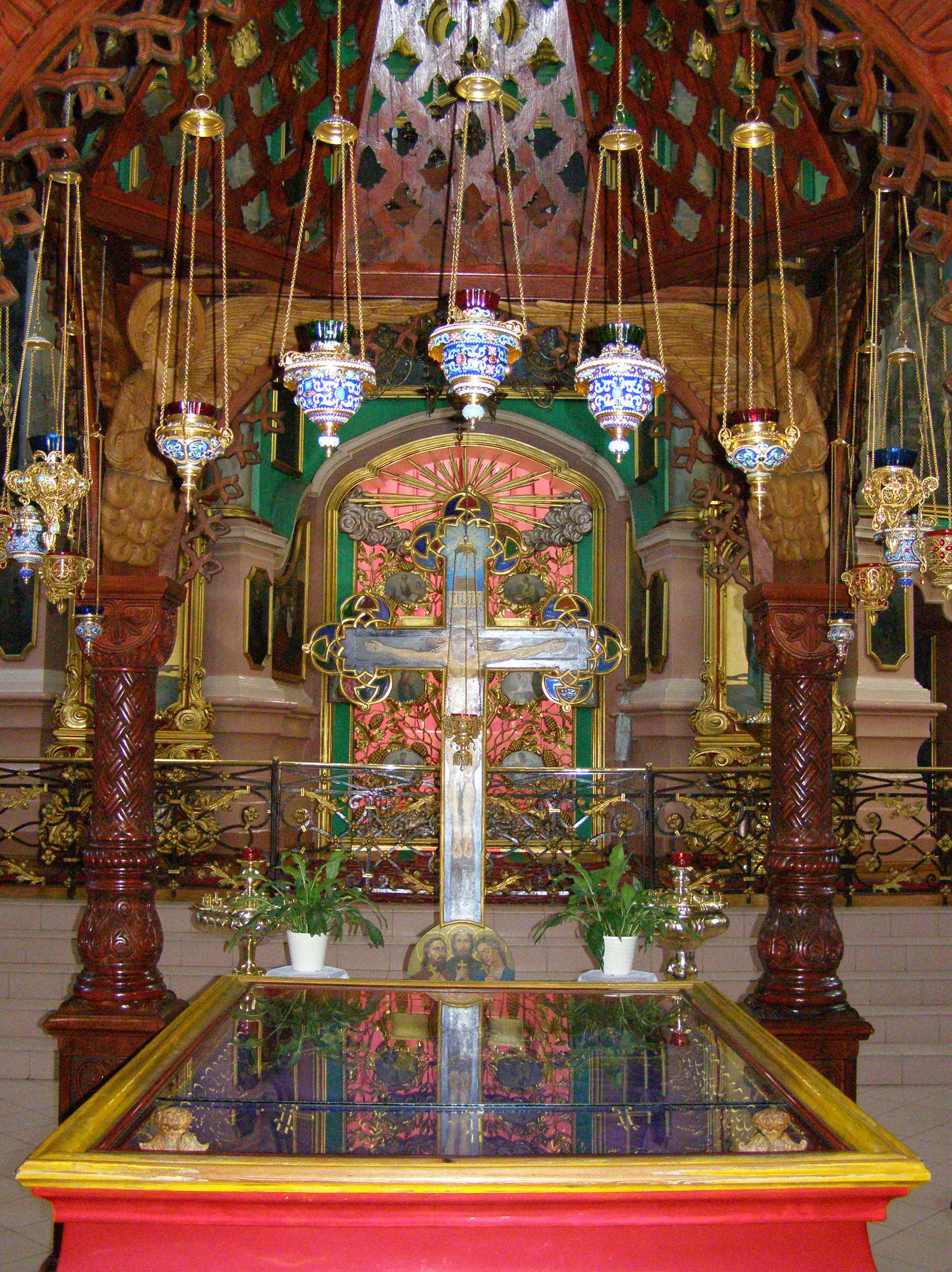
Reliquary with the relics of the Vilnius martyrs

In 1795, following the Third Partition of Poland, Vilnius became part of the Russian Empire as the capital of the governorate. This transition brought significant changes for the monastery, which was subordinated first to the Bishop of Minsk and Volhynia and later to the Bishop of Vilnius, who also served as the head of the monastery. At this time, the community comprised 13 monks, with 9 residing permanently in Vilnius and the others temporarily living in other monasteries under Vilnius' care. By the late 18th century, all but three of these monasteries were declared independent by the Most Holy Synod.

In May 1797, Tsar Paul I recognized the Vilnius monastic community as a second-class monastery, which meant an annual government grant of 2,500 rubles. However, Paul's successor, Alexander I, considered closing the monastery in 1806 due to the lack of active Orthodox churches in Vilnius. He proposed dispersing the monks to other communities and converting the Holy Spirit church into the cathedral for the Vilnius eparchy. The Most Holy Synod strongly advised against closing the monastery, given its revered status and long tradition of strengthening Orthodoxy in Lithuania.

The monastery suffered further damage during the 1812 war when it was occupied by Napoleonic forces, who desecrated the church, burned the royal doors, and damaged the iconostasis. Reconstruction was possible thanks to a 4,500 ruble donation from merchant Alexander Slutsky. In 1833, under Archimandrite Platon (Rudinsky) and with the support of Vilnius governor-general Prince Dolgorukov, the monastery was upgraded to a first-class monastery, increasing its financial support to 4,176 rubles. This funding allowed for the renovation of the monastery church to remove architectural features that resembled Roman Catholic churches. Italian architect Giacomo de la Porto was brought in for the reconstruction. At this time, the monastery housed only five monks. To boost the monastery's prestige, Archimandrite Platon Gorodiecki, the former rector of the Kostroma theological seminary, invited 11 monks or novices from Kostroma to Vilnius. By 1840, the monastery had 9 monks and 5 novices.

In 1845, a new gate adorned with images of Christ and the Descent of the Holy Spirit was built, replacing the old entrance. New altars dedicated to the Descent of the Holy Spirit and Saints Constantine and Helena were added to the church. In 1852, a chapel honoring the Vilnius martyrs – Saints John, Anthony, and Eustathius – was established in the church's basement. These martyrs' relics had been transferred there from the Church of St. Nicholas in 1655. The chapel, funded by Ivan Sienavin, became a significant pilgrimage site. The monastery's basement also became the burial site for Orthodox Bishops of Vilnius, including Joseph Semashko, buried there in 1868. During this period, the monastery housed 9 monks and 5 novices.

The number of monks increased by the late 19th century under Archbishop Juvenaly Polovtsev, reaching 15 monks and 34 novices by 1904. His successor, Metropolitan Nikander Molchanov, oversaw a general renovation of the entire complex, directed by eparchial architect A. Szpakowski. In 1913, Patriarch Tikhon of Moscow initiated the construction of a pilgrim house. The monastery had become a popular pilgrimage destination since the opening of the chapel for the Vilnius martyrs.

Besides its traditional buildings, the monastery owned a two-story house on present-day Aušros Vartų Street, three similar buildings in central Vilnius, and two shops. In the 18th century, it was granted land on the Popowszczyzna suburb, which was fully developed by the following century, generating rental income. The monastery also owned a garden on Ross Street, leased out from 1921 for 36 years, and a single plot on the Lukiškės Square, also leased.

=== During World War I ===
In the first year of World War I, the monks engaged in charitable activities, working in hospitals, and the church held services for Russian military victories. On 25 September 1914, Tsar Nicholas II visited the monastery on his way to the front. In November of the same year, Empress Alexandra Feodorovna and her daughters Olga and Tatiana also visited.

As the front approached Vilnius, most monks evacuated, except for monks Savvatius, Makary, and Nikodem, who received permission to stay. Monk Makary was taken to a prisoner-of-war camp, which he left in 1917, while the others remained. The monastery buildings were undamaged during the war, but the monks did not return until 1919, when a new Bishop of Vilnius, Eleutherius Bogoyavlensky, appointed by the Patriarch of Moscow, arrived.

=== In the Second Polish Republic ===
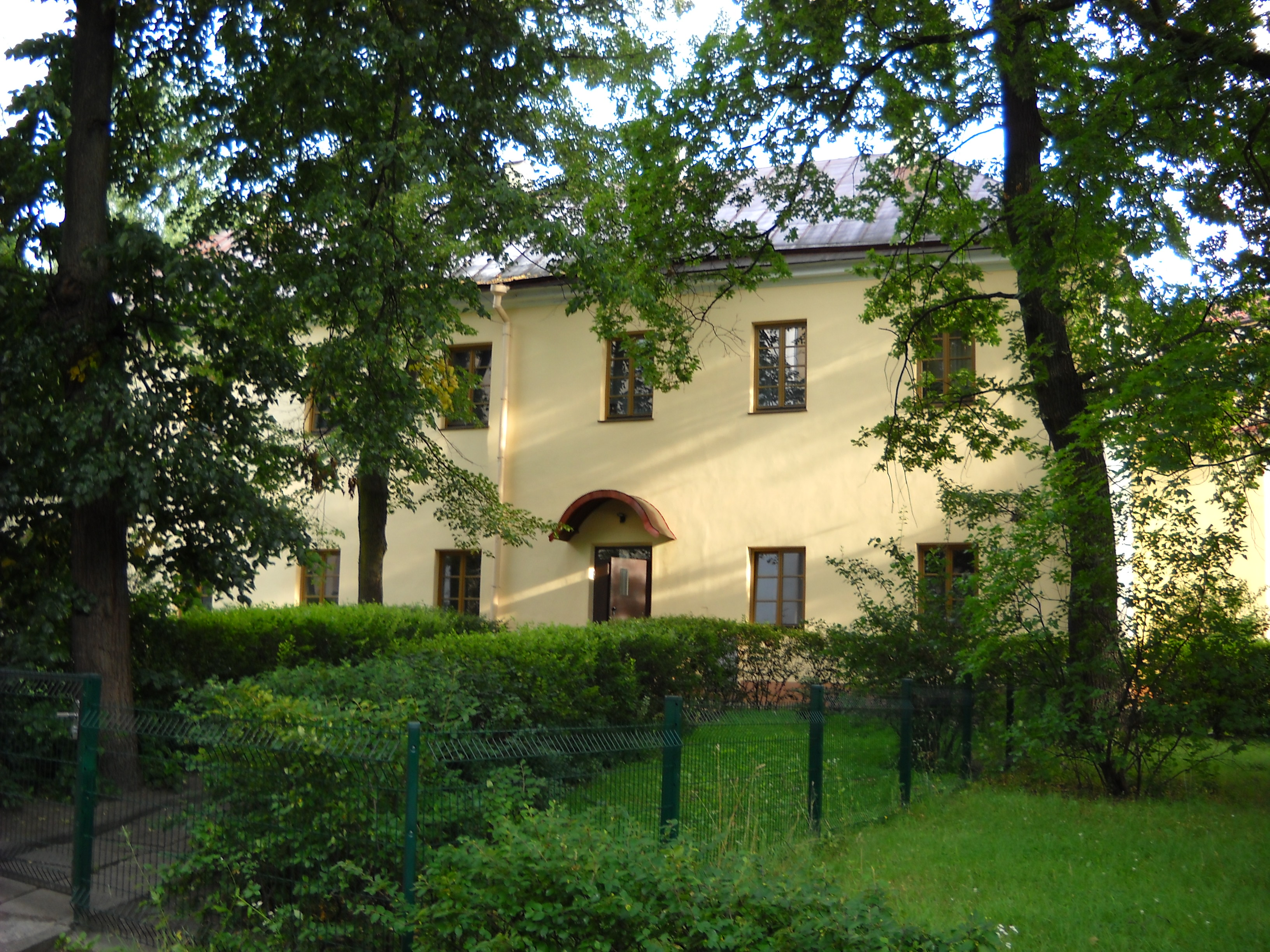
Monastic building

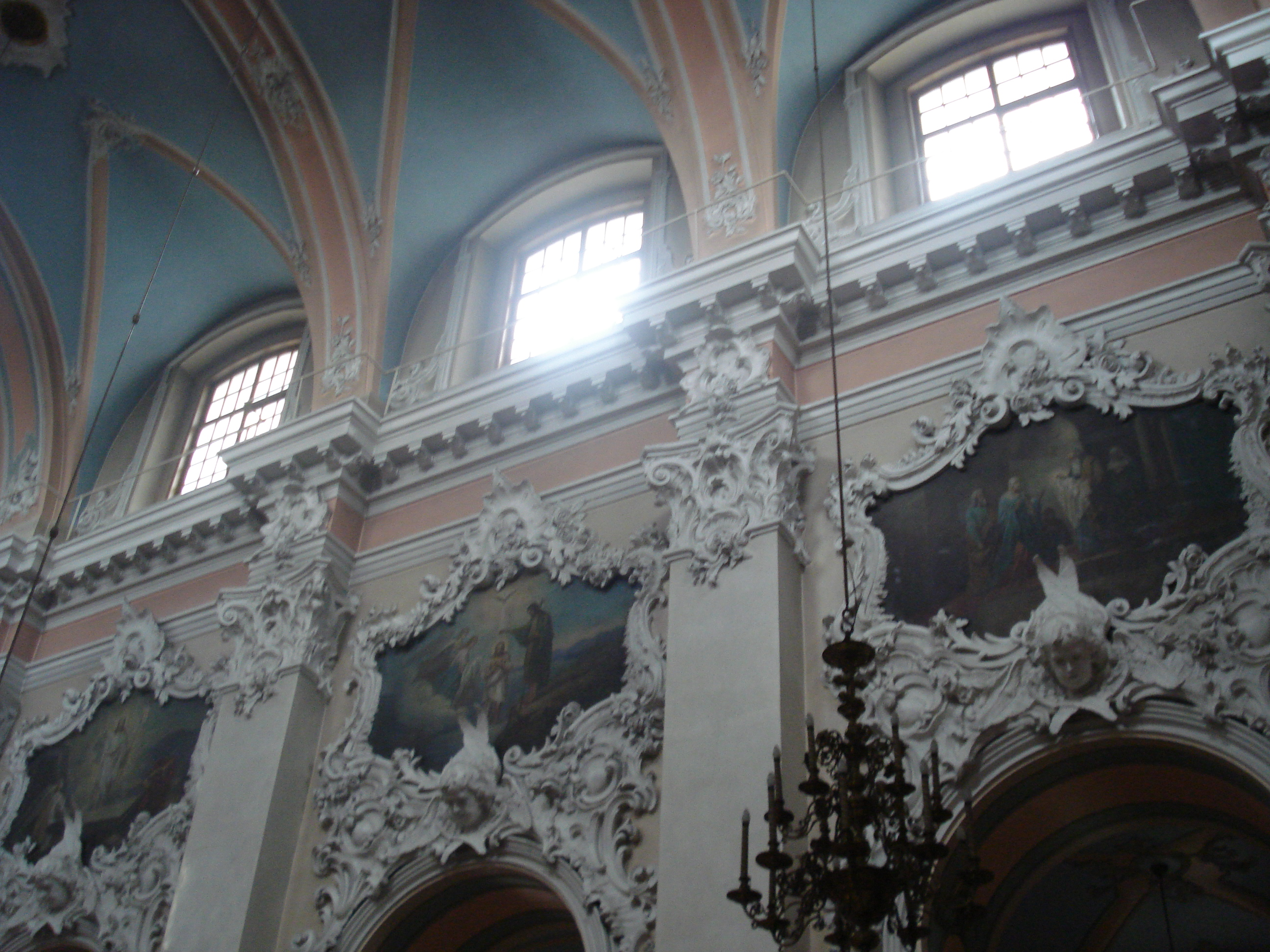
Interior of the church

During the Second Polish Republic, the campaign to reclaim Orthodox church property initially did not threaten the monastery's existence, as it had never been affiliated with Catholic institutions. However, Bishop Eleutherius (Bogoyavlensky) was removed from his episcopal position and thus as monastery head due to his strong opposition to the push for autocephaly of the Orthodox Church in Poland and insubordination to Metropolitan George Yaroshevsky, the church's leader in Poland. Eleutherius was detained at the monastery after a service and forced to leave the country. In 1924, a request from the new Metropolitan of Warsaw, Dionysius Waledyński, for official recognition of the monastery received a favorable response from the Ministry of Religious Affairs and Public Education.

However, in 1925, the monastery lost some of its properties to the state or the Roman Catholic Church, including the Novy Zhirovitsy estate with a mill and farm buildings, residential and farm buildings at Jenczmieniszki (Vilnius County), a farm in Baruny, an inn in Boruny, lands in Smorgon, a mill in Kreva, lakes Niedzingi and Wielkie Dawgi, and three houses and a warehouse in Vilnius. Additionally, the Pstrino lake was now outside the borders of the Second Polish Republic. Lacking arable land, the monastery could not sustain itself through farming but relied on rental income and voluntary donations from the faithful for maintenance and regular building upkeep, such as updating electrical installations in 1928 and purchasing new candleholders for the church. Part of the income also went to legal battles over disputed plots with the Railway Directorate and the State Treasury.

In 1929, Roman Catholic Archbishop of Vilnius, Romuald Jałbrzykowski, filed a lawsuit for the recovery of both the Holy Spirit Church and the monastery. However, the Supreme Court declared in 1934 that it lacked jurisdiction to decide on the ownership of Orthodox sacred sites. Earlier, in 1930, the monastery had been listed among eight Orthodox monasteries slated for closure. However, in August 1934, a government document on the future of Orthodox monasteries under the Polish Orthodox Church included the Holy Spirit Monastery among seven to be retained. The authorities again reconsidered the monastery's future in 1936, listing it for closure, but these plans were ultimately not implemented.

By 1937, the monastery housed 14 monks, including four archimandrites (Note: Including the bishop of Vilnius.) and two hegumens. During World War II, the monks operated an orphanage. Under Nazi occupation following Germany's attack on the Soviet Union, the monastery buildings hosted three-semester courses for future priests. The monastery complex was damaged during the fighting for Vilnius.

=== Within the border of the Soviet Union ===
After 1945, Vilnius was incorporated into the Lithuanian Soviet Socialist Republic, but the monastery continued to operate without interruption throughout the existence of the Soviet Union. Between 1959 and 1960, the church's heating system was renovated, and 16 years later, central heating was installed in the monastery buildings. After 1982, Archbishop Wiktoryn (Bielajew) initiated the construction of an elevator leading to the church towers and renovated the monks' living quarters. The Vilnius Monastery was the only monastery in the Soviet Union that did not face any repression from the authorities, despite the fact that many other churches in the city were closed or repurposed for non-religious functions. The monastery sustained itself solely through donations from the faithful.

In 1947, the monastery was home to 13 monks and 4 novices.

=== In Lithuania ===
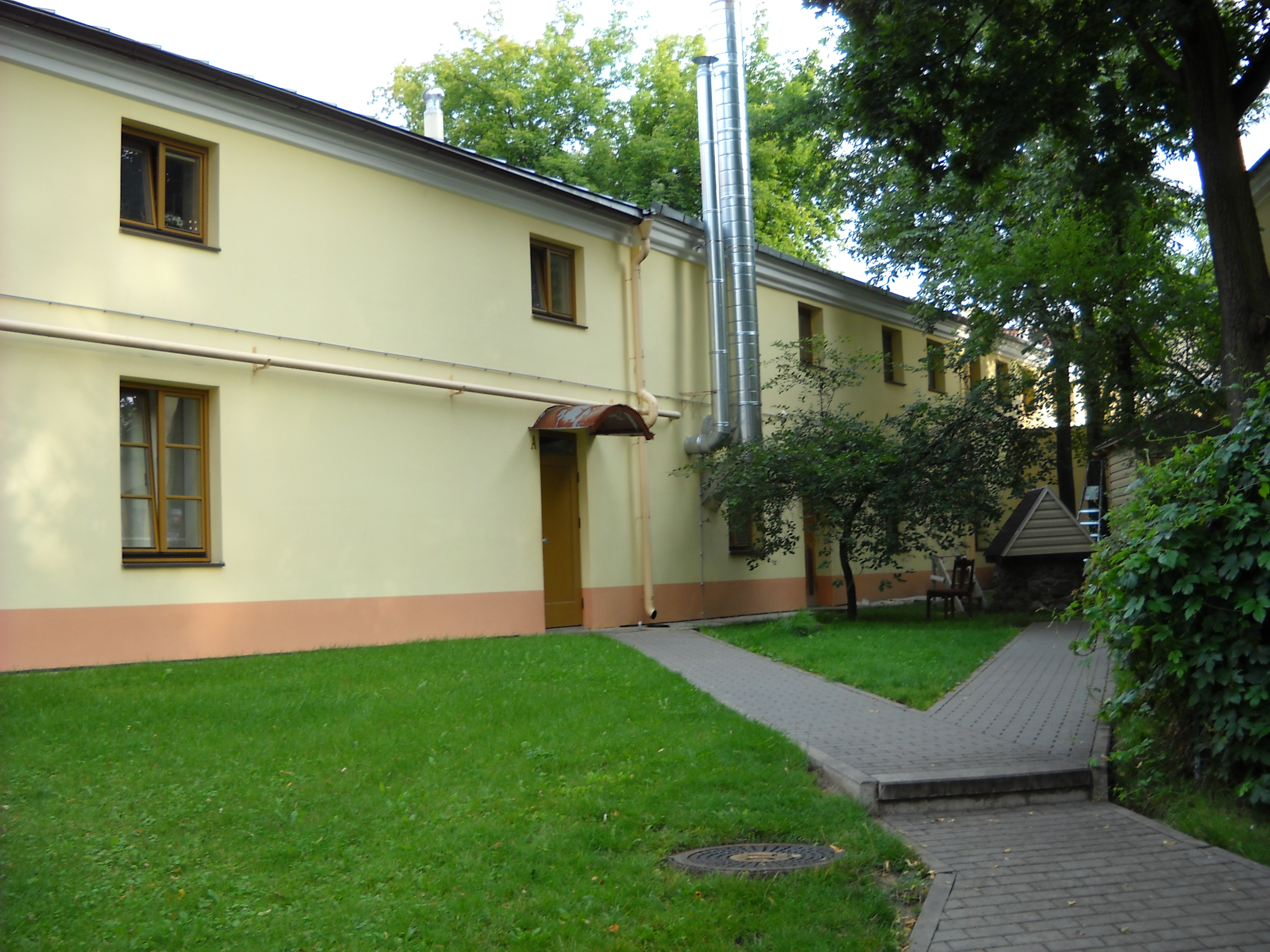
One of the monastery buildings

Since 1993, the monastery has hosted a public library of religious literature with 13,000 volumes. The buildings also house the office of the Vilnius and Lithuanian diocese, as well as its secretariat responsible for the charitable activities conducted by Orthodox priests. The monks run a soup kitchen for the poor and a small guest house. The last major renovation of the monastery buildings was organized by Metropolitan Chrysostom Martyszkin of Vilnius and Lithuania between 1996 and 1997. In July of that year, during the feast of the Descent of the Holy Spirit, the 400th anniversary of the continuous operation of the monastery church was celebrated with the participation of Patriarch Alexy II of Moscow.

Currently, the monastery is home to 10 monks, including two archimandrites and one hegumen. The site remains an important pilgrimage destination and is currently the only male monastery in Lithuania. From 1960 to 2015, one of the monastery buildings was occupied by nuns from the female Monastery of St. Mary Magdalene.

== Architecture ==
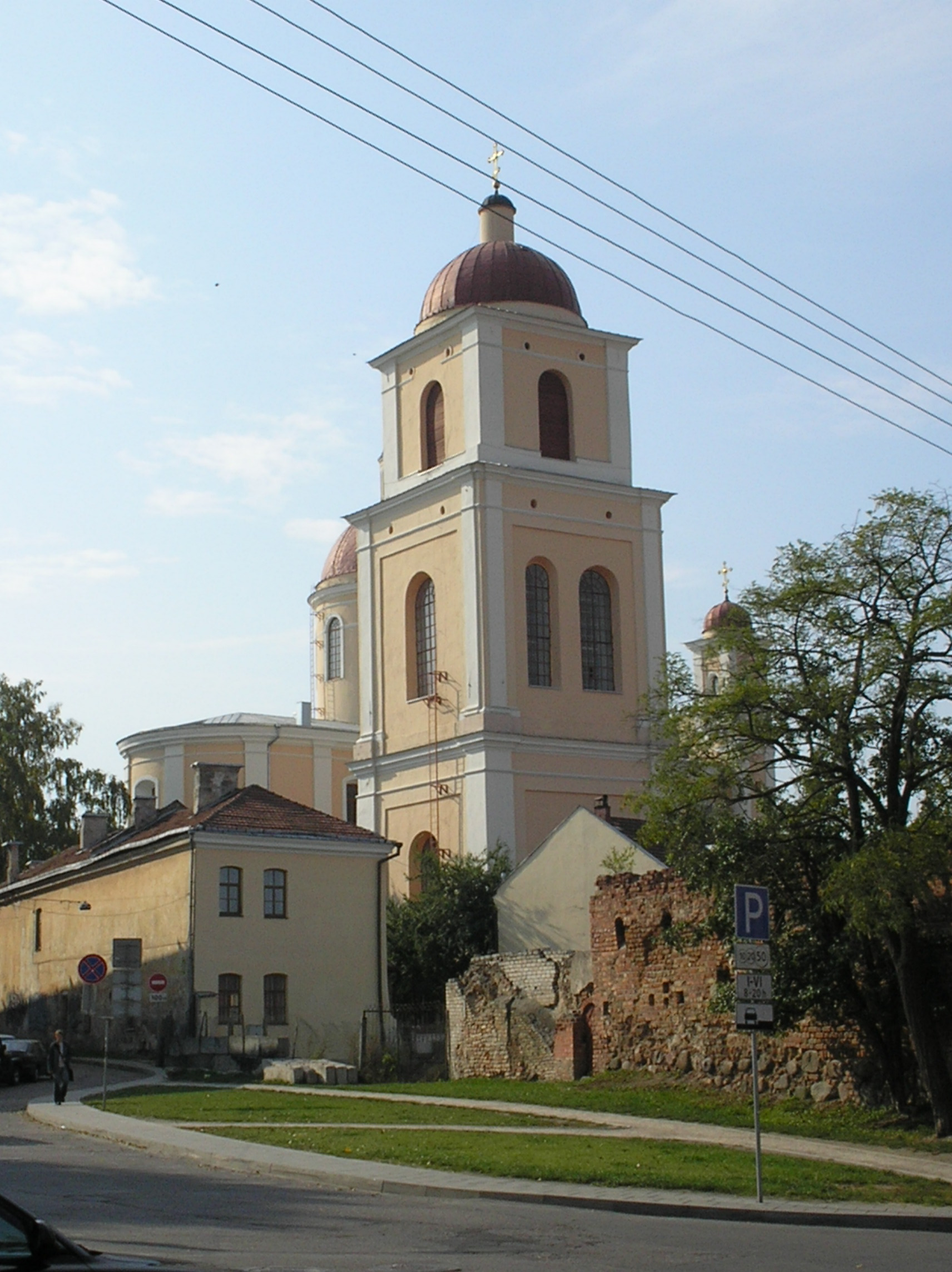
Bell tower and a fragment of the monastery walls

The monastery buildings, inhabited by monks and occupied by the diocesan office and library, have been preserved to this day in the same form as they were rebuilt after the fire in the 18th century. The complex consists of three two-story buildings lacking distinct stylistic features and utility buildings adapted in the second half of the 20th century for new purposes. Only the entrance gate clearly represents the Old Russian style, emphasizing the monastery's spiritual connection to Russian Orthodoxy. The central part of the courtyard is occupied by the monastery church, which also serves as a parish church. Originally built in the Baroque style, after the last reconstruction, it is closer to Classicism. The facade of the building respects the principles of symmetry, with two towers rising to a height of 49 m and topped with domes. The only exterior decoration of the building is rows of Doric pilasters. The building is tripartite and oriented, built on a Latin cross plan. The original Baroque style of the church is visible in the interior, which was formed during the reconstruction in the 1750s. The iconostasis and the bas-reliefs and frescoes on the walls are in this style. The church houses 20 icons by Ivan Trutnev, including the Annunciation icon funded by Empress Maria Alexandrovna. The center of the nave is occupied by an ornate reliquary containing the relics of the Vilnius martyrs.

== Superiors of the monastery ==
Traditionally, the position of the superior of the Holy Spirit Monastery was held by the Orthodox Bishop of Vilnius, who appointed his deputy in the monastery. However, there were exceptions to this rule. Below is a list of the superiors of the monastery who did not concurrently hold the position of bishop:

- Archimandrite Ambrose Juszkiewicz (1731–1734)
- Archimandrite Jerome Volchanski (1734)
- Archimandrite Hiacynt (Pielkiński) (1776–1787)
- Archimandrite Barlaam Shyshatsky (1787–1789)
- Archimandrite Daniel (Nattok-Michajłowski Mirdamski) (1797–1800)
- Archimandrite Epifaniusz (Sawwicz-Kaniwiecki) (1807–1808)
- Archimandrite Platon Gorodiecki (1839)
- Monk Aleksander Dobrynin (1851–1860)
- Monk Jan (Pszczołko) (1862–1870)
- Monk Nestor Fomin (1891–1895)
- Monk Antoni Marcenko (1922–1923)
- Hegumen Adrian Ulyanov (1988–1990)

== Bibliography ==
- Pawluczuk, U. A. (2007). Życie monastyczne w II Rzeczypospolitej (in Polish). Białystok: Wydawnictwo Uniwersytetu w Białymstoku. ISBN 978-83-7431-127-4.
- Szlewis, G. (2006). "Свято-Духов Монастыр". Православные храмы Литвы (in Russian). Vilnius: Духов монастырь. ISBN 9986-559-62-6.
