= Eleutherius Bogoyavlensky =

Clergyman of the Russian Orthodox Church

Eleutherius
- Metropolitan of Vilnius and Lithuania
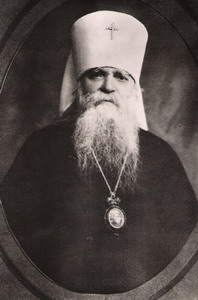
- Church: Russian Orthodox Church
- See: Russian Empire, Lithuania
- Appointed: 1911
- In office: 1928–1940

Orders
- Ordination: 1904
- Consecration: August 21, 1911 by Patriarch Sergius of Moscow

Personal details
- Born: Dmitri Bogoyavlensky; October 14, 1868, 1869 or 1870 Stary Oskol
- Died: December 31, 1940 Vilnius
- Buried: Orthodox Church of the Holy Spirit, Vilnius
- Denomination: Eastern Orthodoxy

Eleutherius, secular name Dmitri Yakovlevich Bogoyavlensky (born 14 October 1870, 1868, or 1869 in Stary Oskol; died 31 December 1940 in Vilnius), was a clergyman of the Russian Orthodox Church. As Bishop of Vilnius and Lithuania, he served from 1919 to 1922 in the territories of the Second Polish Republic, actively opposing efforts for the Polish Orthodox Church to gain autocephaly. Expelled from Poland, he resided in Kaunas until 1939. He contributed to the revival of Orthodox parish life in Lithuanian territories. From 1931 to 1940, he held the title of Metropolitan of Vilnius and Lithuania alongside the title of Exarch of Western Europe.

== Biography ==
=== Early activity ===
He was born into the family of a poor church psalmist in Kursk Governorate. He graduated from the theological seminary in Kursk and then taught at the church school in Yamskaya Sloboda, during which time he got married. In 1890, he was ordained as a priest and assigned to pastoral work in the parish of the Protection of the Mother of God in Trostianka in Kursk Governorate. After ten years of marriage, he became a widower. He then entered the Saint Petersburg Theological Academy, graduating in 1904 with the title of Candidate of Theology. At the same time, he took monastic vows. As a graduate of the academy, he was appointed to work as a lecturer in homiletics at the theological seminary in Kamianets-Podilskyi. In 1906, he became the inspector of the theological seminary in Chełm. Three years later, he received the dignity of archimandrite and assumed the duties of rector of the theological seminary in Smolensk.

=== Bishop ===
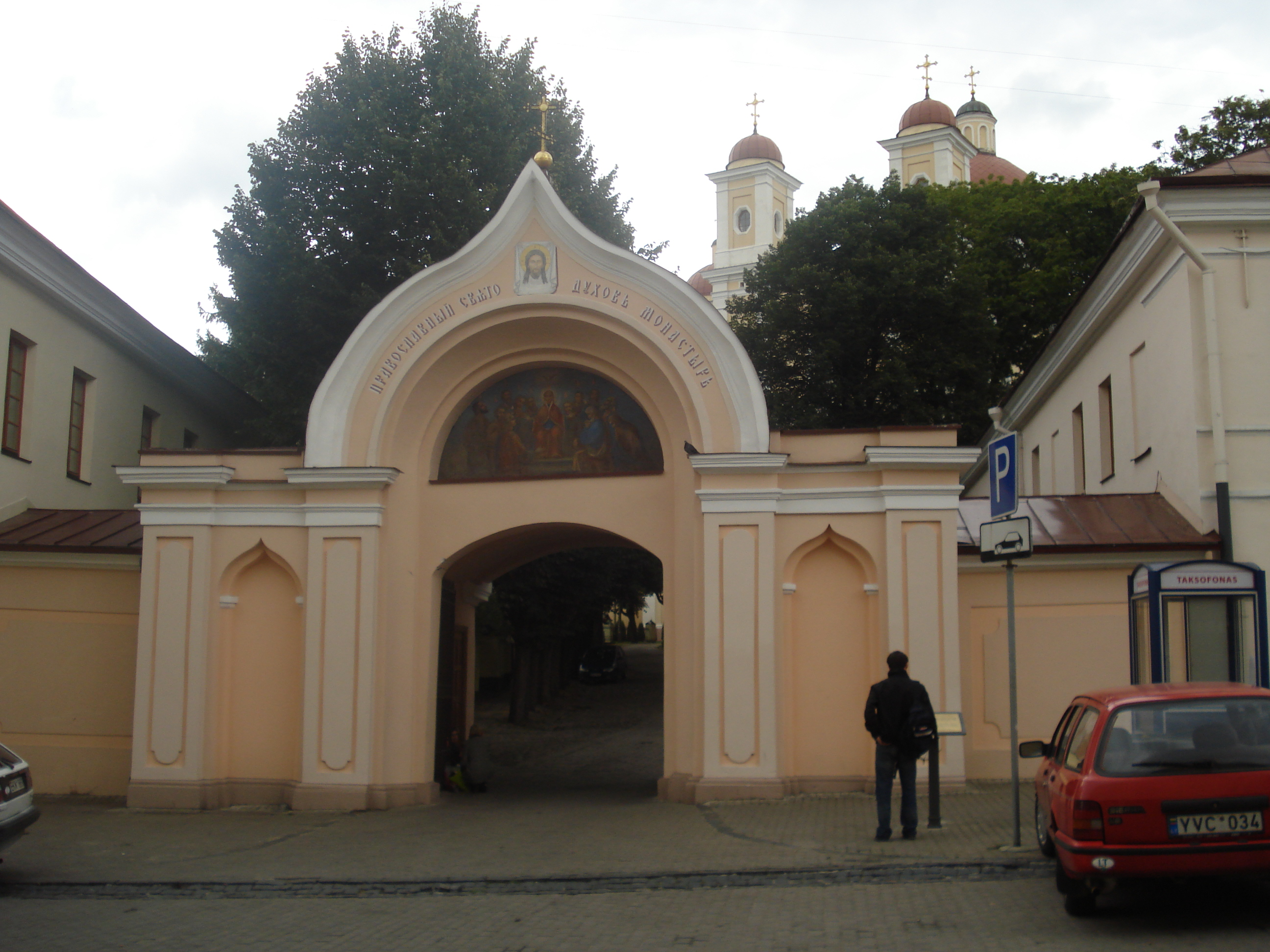
Gate of the Holy Spirit Monastery in Vilnius. As locum tenens and later as the ordinary of the Diocese of Vilnius and Lithuania, Archbishop Eleutherius resided on its grounds

On 21 August 1911, his episcopal consecration took place at the Holy Trinity Cathedral of the Alexander Nevsky Lavra, presided over by Archbishop Sergius of Finland and Vyborg. Eleutherius was then made Bishop of Kaunas, auxiliary bishop of the Diocese of Vilnius and Lithuania. He left Kaunas after the outbreak of World War I, fleeing from the front in 1914. When leaving Lithuania, he took with him the relics of Anthony, John, and Eustathius from Vilnius. Until 1917, he stayed at the Donskoy Monastery in Moscow. In June of that year, he was appointed locum tenens of the Diocese of Vilnius and Lithuania, after the previous Metropolitan of Vilnius, Tikhon, was elected Metropolitan of Moscow and Kolomna. He participated in the 1917–18 Local Council of the Russian Orthodox Church. After the council concluded, he returned to Vilnius. There, on 24 May 1920, he attended a meeting with representatives of the Polish Ministry of Religious Denominations and Public Enlightenment, who considered entrusting him with the administration of the Diocese of Chełm and Warsaw and, in the future, supporting efforts toward the autocephaly of the church in Poland. However, ultimately, the other cleric present at the meeting – Bishop Vladimir of Białystok – was deemed a better candidate.

On 28 June 1921, Patriarch Tikhon appointed him head of the Diocese of Vilnius and Lithuania with the title of archbishop. Traditionally, he also held the position of superior of the Monastery of the Holy Spirit in Vilnius. After the Żeligowski's Mutiny, his jurisdiction was divided by a national border. Vilnius initially became part of the Republic of Central Lithuania and was later incorporated into Poland. As a result, in the first two years of his leadership, the archbishop had no influence over events in the parts of the diocese that remained within the borders of Kaunas Lithuania; all his activities up to 1923 focused on the affairs of the Orthodox Church in the Second Polish Republic.

=== Activities in independent Poland ===
Archbishop Eleutherius was firmly opposed to efforts for the autocephaly of the Orthodox Church in Poland. He supported maintaining the jurisdictional status quo (i.e., keeping the territory of independent Poland under the Moscow Patriarchate and the entire Rus’); accordingly, he did not recognize Metropolitan George of Warsaw as his superior, despite some support for him from Patriarch Tikhon. He also criticized the decision by some Orthodox bishops to hold discussions with the Polish state authorities regarding the future organization of the church. He participated in a council of Orthodox bishops in Poland on 30 May 1922, during which he opposed a declaration by Metropolitan George that Orthodox issues in Poland should be resolved without consultation with Moscow (i.e., neither with the patriarchate nor with the Bolshevik-supported Living Church). Together with locum tenens of the Grodno Diocese, Vladimir, he proposed an amendment stating that the council of Polish bishops, if faced with issues under the patriarch's jurisdiction, could only act unanimously. However, this amendment was not accepted, leading Eleutherius and Vladimir to leave the council proceedings. Both hierarchs issued their own statement, claiming that the actions of Metropolitan George and the bishops supporting him violated canon law. They emphasized that they would only support potential efforts for autocephaly if Patriarch Tikhon explicitly approved the Polish Church's independence. Citing poor health, Archbishop Eleutherius did not attend the next bishops' assembly on 15 June 1922, which voted to request autocephaly from the Ecumenical Patriarch of Constantinople. He was also not appointed to the Most Holy Synod of the church in Poland, established during the council.

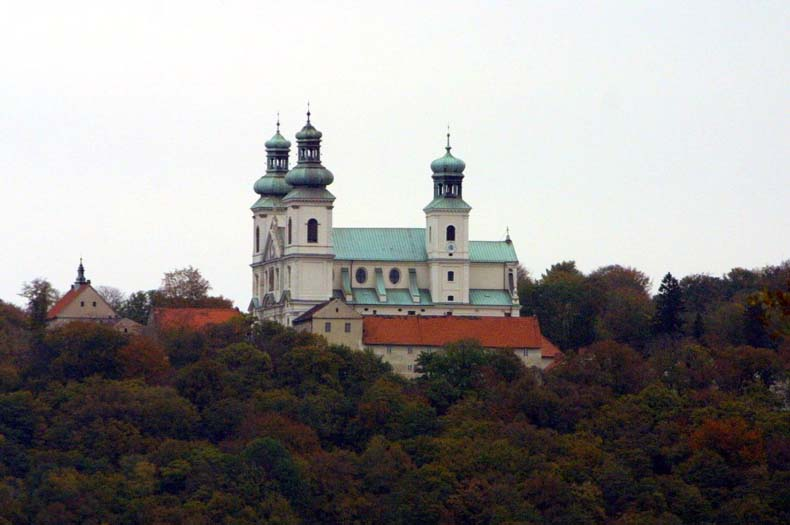
View of the Camaldolese monastery in Kraków, where Archbishop Eleutherius was forcibly confined for three months. The reason for his removal from the Vilnius cathedral and internment was his strong opposition to efforts to grant autocephalous status to the Orthodox Church in Poland

In response, Archbishop Eleutherius convened a meeting of the clergy from his diocese in Vilnius, which on June 30 adopted a protest against the actions of Metropolitan George and other proponents of autocephaly, sending it to other canonical Orthodox Churches. Some Russian White émigré organizations also signed the letter. Archbishop Eleutherius refused to pay the required contributions to support the church and even forbade priests in his diocese from praying for Metropolitan George during services. At the same time, the archbishop sought to revitalize parish life in the Vilnius region, which had diminished after the period of mass evacuation of Orthodox Christians. He provided special care for the women's Monastery of St. Mary Magdalene in Vilnius. When the nuns of this community lost their previous convent (confiscated by the authorities from the Visitation Sisters during the Tsarist period), he arranged for their temporary residence in the buildings of the dissolved men's Monastery of the Holy Trinity.

His outspoken opposition to George and the bishops supporting him led to his removal from the cathedral. On 6 September 1922, a synod composed of three hierarchs – Metropolitan George, Archbishop Dionysius Waledyński, and Bishop Alexander Inozemtsev – deemed his actions "non-canonical, illegal, and anarchistic" and relieved him of the administration of the Vilnius Diocese. On 14 September 1922, Archbishop Eleutherius was detained immediately after celebrating the Divine Liturgy in the monastery Church of the Holy Spirit in Vilnius and spent three months at the Camaldolese Priory in Kraków. Despite efforts to keep his internment secret, his situation came to light, sparking protests from Belarusian and Ukrainian minority deputies, as well as from the faithful of the Vilnius Diocese. Lithuania also protested, and the League of Nations appealed to the Polish authorities to allow the hierarch to leave. Ultimately, Eleutherius left the Camaldolese monastery on 5 December 1922.

=== Activities in Lithuania ===
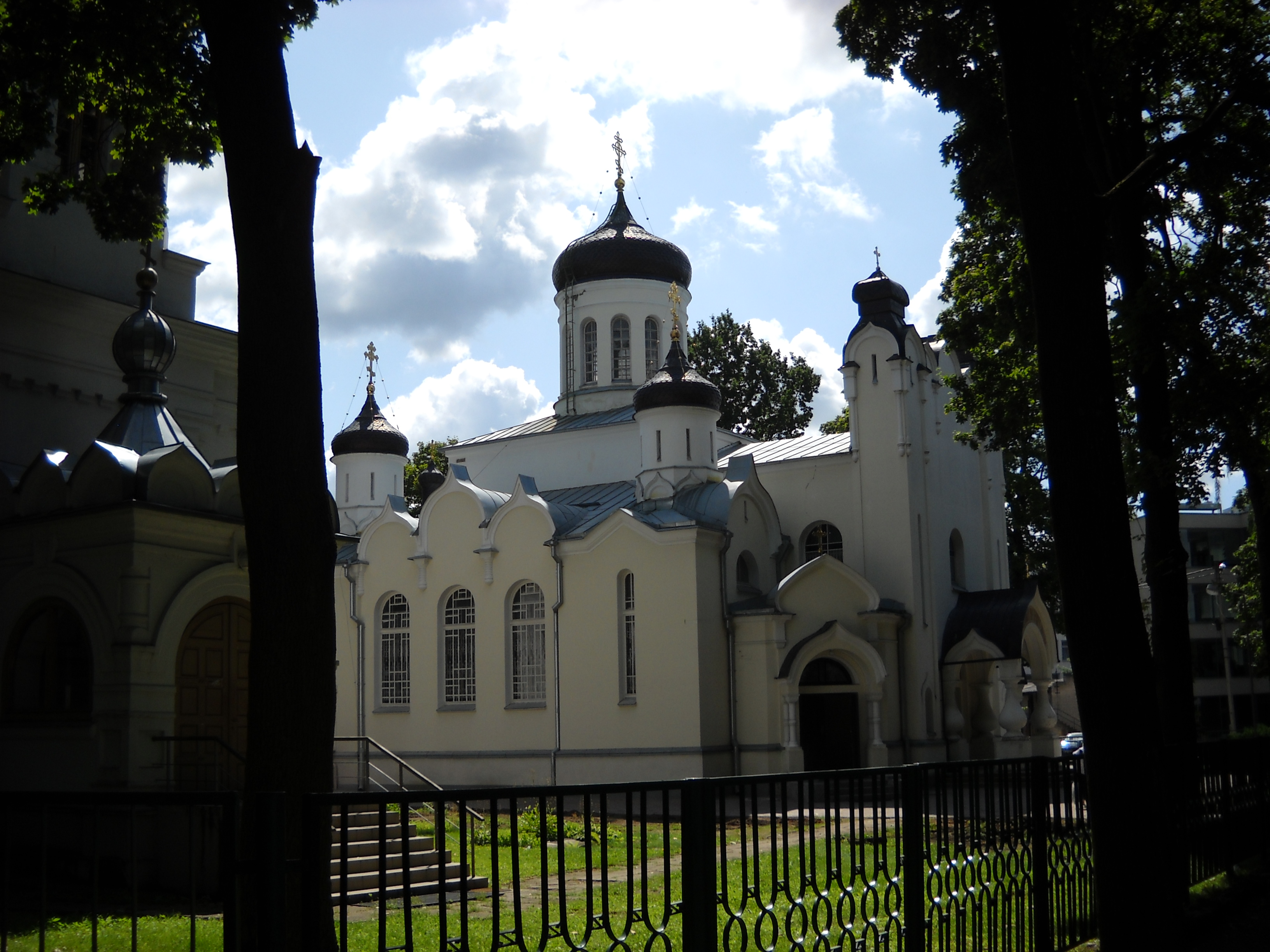
Annunciation Cathedral in Kaunas, built in the 1930s as the cathedral for the Metropolitan of Vilnius and Lithuania with the involvement of Metropolitan Eleutherius

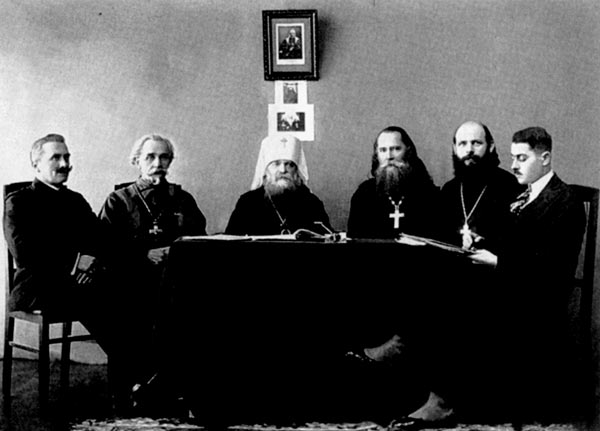
Metropolitan Eleutherius with members of the diocesan council. Photo from the late 1920s and early 1930s

After his release, Archbishop Eleutherius went to Kaunas, where he resumed his duties as Metropolitan of Vilnius and Lithuania. His jurisdiction was limited by the Polish-Lithuanian border. Although he still considered himself the head of the diocese within its pre-World War I boundaries, he had no control over parishes in the Vilnius region (the Vilnius Cathedral, under the jurisdiction of the Polish Orthodox Church, was administered by Bishop Theodosius Feodosiev). In 1923, the Lithuanian government designated Kaunas as the seat of the Orthodox Church leader within Lithuania's borders. On 29 March 1922, the Lithuanian authorities, despite initial reservations, tentatively accepted Archbishop Eleutherius for this position and abandoned efforts to detach the Lithuanian diocese from the Russian Church; until his arrival in Kaunas, he was represented by Father Nikolai Savitsky, who served at the Holy Resurrection Orthodox Church in Kaunas. On 4 December 1924, Patriarch Tikhon awarded him the right to wear a diamond cross on his klobuk for his pastoral work.

As head of the Vilnius and Lithuanian diocese, he participated in drafting documents regulating relations between the Lithuanian government and Orthodox Church institutions. He also sought to establish Orthodox charitable associations in Lithuania. He was the initiator of the diocese's press organ, initially the Russian-language Lithuanian Diocesan News, later renamed Voice of the Lithuanian Orthodox Diocese. He contributed to the construction of a new cathedral in Kaunas, intended as a temporary seat for Vilnius bishops. His main focus, however, was the restoration of parish life, which had largely collapsed on Lithuanian territory after World War I due to the mass exodus of clergy and believers to Russia. Metropolitan Eleutherius reorganized several parishes in Lithuania, ordained new priests to minister in rural parishes, repaired existing churches, and initiated the construction of new ones to replace those built during the Tsarist era or those set up in Catholic churches requisitioned by the state, which Orthodox believers returned to their rightful owners after 1918.

During disputes between locum tenens of the Moscow Patriarchate, Metropolitan Sergius, and hierarchs opposed to his loyalty to Soviet authorities, he unequivocally supported the former. In 1928, he traveled to Moscow to present a report on the state of Orthodoxy in Poland and Lithuania. For his stance during the Polish Orthodox Church's autocephaly dispute, he was granted the rank of Metropolitan. Additionally, as the head of a diocese entirely within a different state from the Soviet Union, he was given the right to administer it in a manner similar to autonomous Orthodox churches.

In 1936, on the 25th anniversary of his episcopal consecration, he was awarded the First Class Order of the Lithuanian Grand Duke Gediminas.

=== Exarch of Western Europe ===
In 1930, a conflict escalated between Metropolitan Sergius and the head of the Patriarchal Exarchate in Western Europe, Metropolitan Eulogius. This dispute, centered on the degree of loyalty expected from Orthodox hierarchs outside the Soviet Union (particularly regarding the public acknowledgment of the Russian church's persecution), ultimately led to Metropolitan Eulogius' suspension from the clergy. Initially, Metropolitan Sergius assigned the vacant exarch position to Archbishop Vladimir of Nice, the Exarchate's vicar bishop. However, when Archbishop Vladimir declined, Metropolitan Eleutherius was appointed as the new exarch. Despite this new role, he remained on the Lithuanian throne, continuing to reside in Kaunas. His appointment was based on his unwavering loyalty to Metropolitan Sergius. As exarch, he sought to unify the Russian diaspora under his leadership and counter the growth of the Russian Orthodox Church Outside of Russia and the Western European Exarchate of Russian Parishes.

In 1939, following Poland's defeat by Nazi Germany and the Soviet Union and Stalin's decision to transfer Vilnius and the Vilnius region to Lithuania, Metropolitan Eleutherius returned to Vilnius. Archbishop Theodosius Feodosiev voluntarily relinquished the see to him and acknowledged the jurisdiction of the Russian Orthodox Church. On 20 December 1939, Metropolitan Sergius of Moscow and Kolomna confirmed Eleutherius' authority to govern the entire Vilnius and Lithuanian diocese within its pre-1914 borders. However, in the following year, afflicted by meningitis, he resigned and retired to the Monastery of the Holy Spirit in Vilnius, where he later died. He was buried in the monastery church.

His brother, Ivan (who took monastic vows under the name Isidore), was also an Orthodox bishop.

== Bibliography ==
- Mironowicz, A. (2001). Kościół prawosławny na ziemiach polskich w XIX i XX wieku [The Orthodox Church in Polish Lands in the 19th and 20th Centuries] (in Polish). Białystok: Wydawnictwo Uniwersytetu w Białymstoku. ISBN 83-7431-046-4.
- Papierzyńska-Turek, M. (1989). Między tradycją a rzeczywistością. Państwo wobec prawosławia 1918–1939 [Between Tradition and Reality: The State and Orthodoxy 1918–1939] (in Polish). Warsaw: Państwowe Wydawnictwo Naukowe. ISBN 83-01-08985-7.
- Szlewis, G. (2006). Pravoslavnye khramy Litvy, Svyato-Dukhov Monastyr' Православные храмы Литвы, Свято-Духов Монастыр [Orthodox Churches of Lithuania, Holy Spirit Monastery] (in Russian). Vilnius: Państwowe Wydawnictwo Naukowe. ISBN 9986-559-62-6.
