= Bogoyavlensky =

Bogoyavlensky, feminine: Bogoyavlenskaya is a Russian surname originated in clergy, it is derived from "явление бога", 'manifestation of God', i.e., epiphany and named after the holiday of Epiphany. Notable people with the surname include:

- Eleutherius Bogoyavlensky (1869(?)–1940), clergyman of the Russian Orthodox Church
- Vladimir Bogoyavlensky (1848–1918, clergyman of the Russian Orthodox Church
