= Orthodox Church of St. Nicholas, Vilnius =

Russian Orthodox church in Lithuania

Orthodox Church of St. Nicholas
- Church of the Transfer of the Relics of St. Nicholas the Wonderworker in Vilnius
- Lithuanian: Vilniaus šv. Mikalojaus Stebukladario palaikų Pernešimo cerkvė
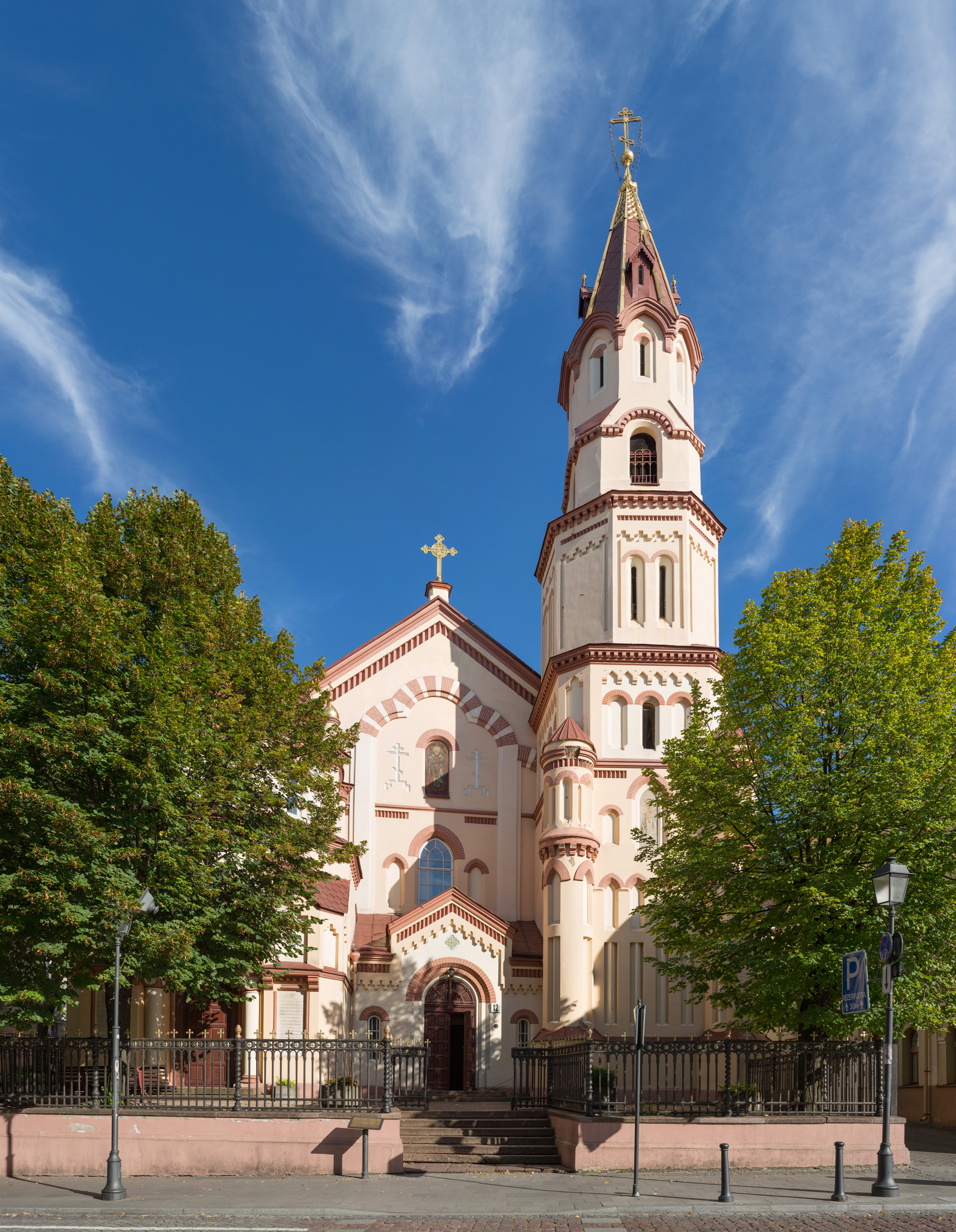
- Main façade
- Click on the map for a fullscreen view
- 54°40′47″N 25°17′19″E
- Location: Vilnius
- Country: Lithuania
- Denomination: Eastern Orthodoxy

History
- Founded: 1340
- Founder: Grand Duchess Uliana of Tver
- Dedication: Saint Nicholas

Architecture
- Functional status: Active
- Style: Gothic, Baroque, Neo-Byzantine
- Years built: 1604–1618

Administration
- Diocese: Russian Orthodox Diocese of Lithuania

UNESCO World Heritage Site
- Official name: Vilnius Old Town
- Type: Cultural
- Criteria: Cultural: (ii), (iv)
- Designated: 1994
- Reference no.: 541
- UNESCO region: Europe

Church of the Transfer of the Relics of St. Nicholas the Wonderworker in Vilnius or St. Nicholas Church (Lithuanian: Vilniaus šv. Mikalojaus Stebukladario palaikų Pernešimo cerkvė; Russian: Никольская церковь) is one of the oldest Eastern Orthodox churches in Vilnius, Lithuania, and belongs to the Russian Orthodox Diocese of Lithuania.

== History ==
According to a popular legend, the first wooden Orthodox chapel located on the place of today's St. Nicholas church was built around 1340. Seven years later, the Vilnius martyrs were supposedly buried there. However, in 1350, Grand Duchess Uliana of Tver, the second wife of the Grand Duke Algirdas of Lithuania, ordered the construction of a new brickwork church. In 1514, this church was again replaced with a larger one. It remained Orthodox up to 1609, when, like most of Vilnius Orthodox churches, it was given to the Uniates on a personal order of the Sigismund III Vasa.

Around 1740, the church was completely destroyed by fire and rebuilt in Baroque style. After the Partitions of the Polish-Lithuanian Commonwealth, Lithuania was annexed by the Russian Empire and in 1839, the Russian local government closed the Uniate parish and gave the building back to the Orthodox. After the failed January Uprising, it was completely rebuilt in Neo-Byzantine style on the personal initiative of the general-governor of Vilnius Mikhail Nikolayevich Muravyov-Vilensky. The renewed church was to be another sign of Russian domination in the city, becoming the fifth Orthodox church in the Old Town of Vilnius. Muraviev also ordered the construction of St. Michael the Archangel chapel, which was to commemorate his victory over the uprising. In 1866, the whole church was reconsecrated. The general-governor's role in the reconstruction of the church was described on a marble plaque on the western wall of the church.

After World War II, the church was closed, but in 1947, the Stalinist government agreed to reopen it as a parish church. The general renovation of the building took place before 1956.
