= Orthodox Church of the Holy Spirit, Vilnius =

Russian Orthodox church in Vilnius, Lithuania

Coordinates: 54°40′32″N 25°17′27″E

Orthodox Church of the Holy Spirit
- Vilniaus Šv. Dvasios vienuolyno katedra
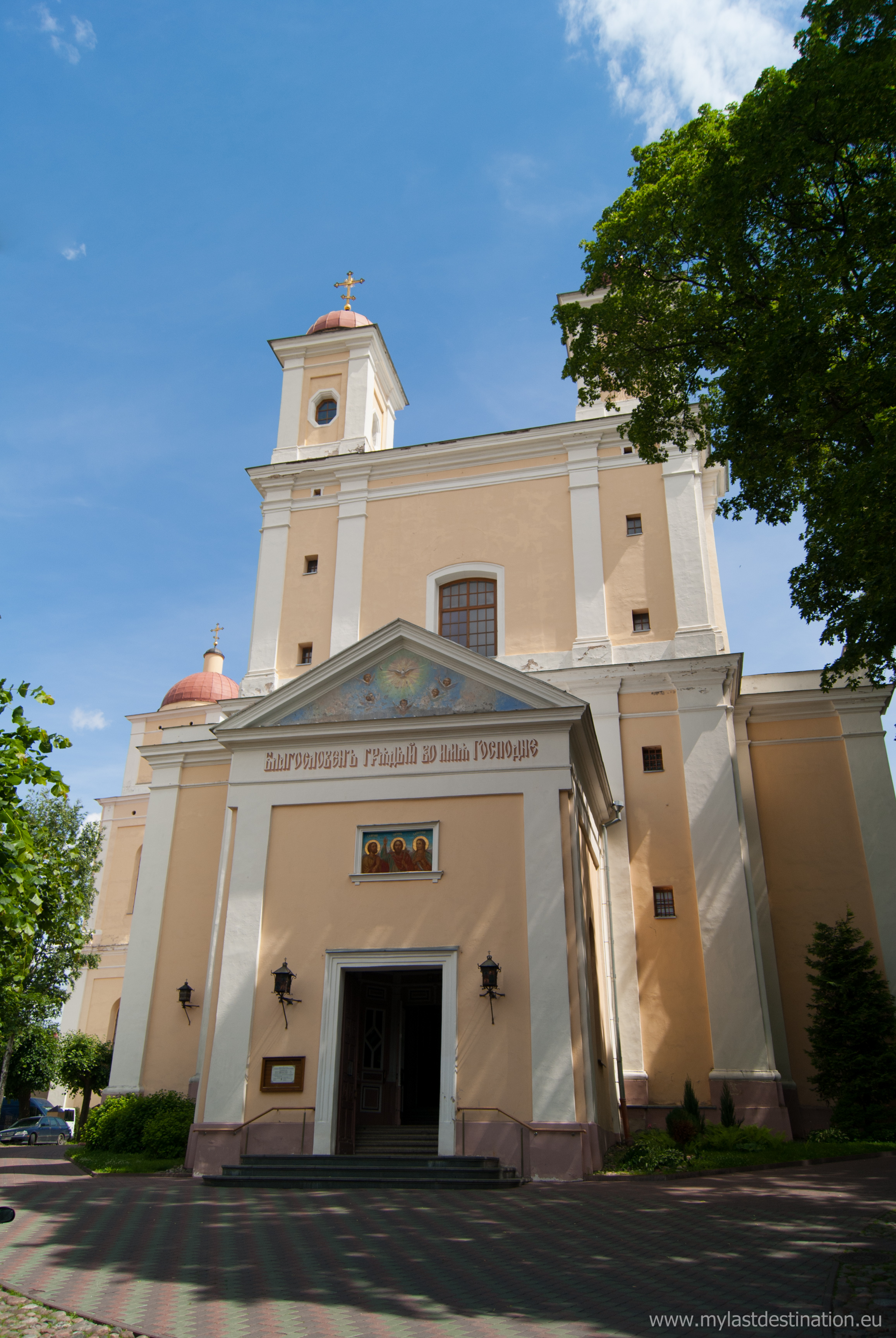
- Orthodox Church of the Holy Spirit
- Location: Vilnius, Lithuania
- Denomination: Russian Orthodox
- Previous denomination: Catholic

History
- Status: Cathedral
- Founded: 1638

Architecture
- Architect: Johann Christoph Glaubitz
- Style: Vilnian Baroque
- Years built: 1749–1753

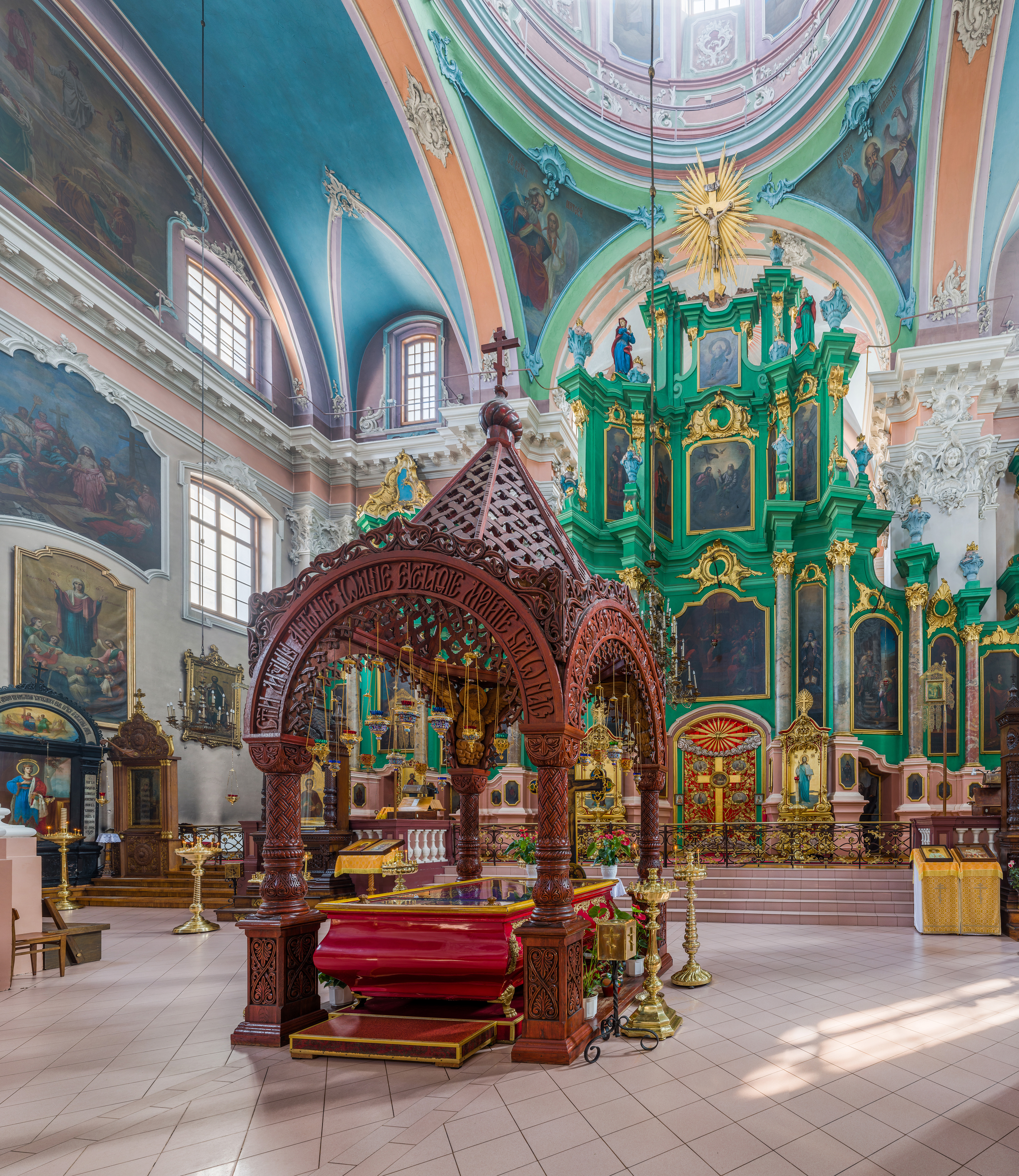
Reliquary, before the Iconostasis and nave, 2014

The Orthodox Church of the Holy Spirit (Lithuanian: Vilniaus Šv. Dvasios vienuolyno katedra; Russian: Церковь Святого Духа) is a Russian Orthodox church in the Vilnius Old Town, capital of Lithuania, rebuilt 1749–1753 in the Vilnian Baroque style. The monastery serves as the headquarters of the Russian Orthodox Diocese of Lithuania. It should not be confused with the Roman Catholic Church of the Holy Spirit in Vilnius.

== History ==
The site of the present church used to be occupied by a wooden church, following the form a Latin cross, erected in 1638, when Vilnius was part of the Polish–Lithuanian Commonwealth. Associated with the church was a convent, opened in 1567.

After a fire gutted the wooden church in the 18th century, a stone church was erected in 1749–1753 in the Baroque style, with details of the interior in Roccoco style. It was designed by Johann Christoph Glaubitz, an architect of German descent who was noted for developing a Lithuanian school of Baroque architecture, known as Vilnian Baroque.

== Architecture ==
In the 19th century, when Vilnius was part of the Russian Empire, several Byzantine Revival architectural elements were added to the church, but it nevertheless retained its essentially Baroque form. Indeed, the added Orthodox frescoes, Iconostasis and dome enhanced its magnificence, as did the addition of deep blue and green interior decor. Unusual in an Orthodox church are the Scagliola (simulated marble) sculptures. A new reliquary was added in 1853.

In a carved wooden reliquary in the center of the church lie the remains of Saints Anthony, John, and Eustathios. A tradition of the church is to cloak them in black during Lent, in white at Christmas and in red on other major religious holidays.

== Present ==
The Church of the Holy Spirit is the major Orthodox church in Lithuania, and it is affiliated with two Orthodox monasteries: The Monastery of the Holy Spirit and the Monastery of Saint Mary Magdalene. These are the only remaining Orthodox monasteries in Lithuania.

== Gallery ==
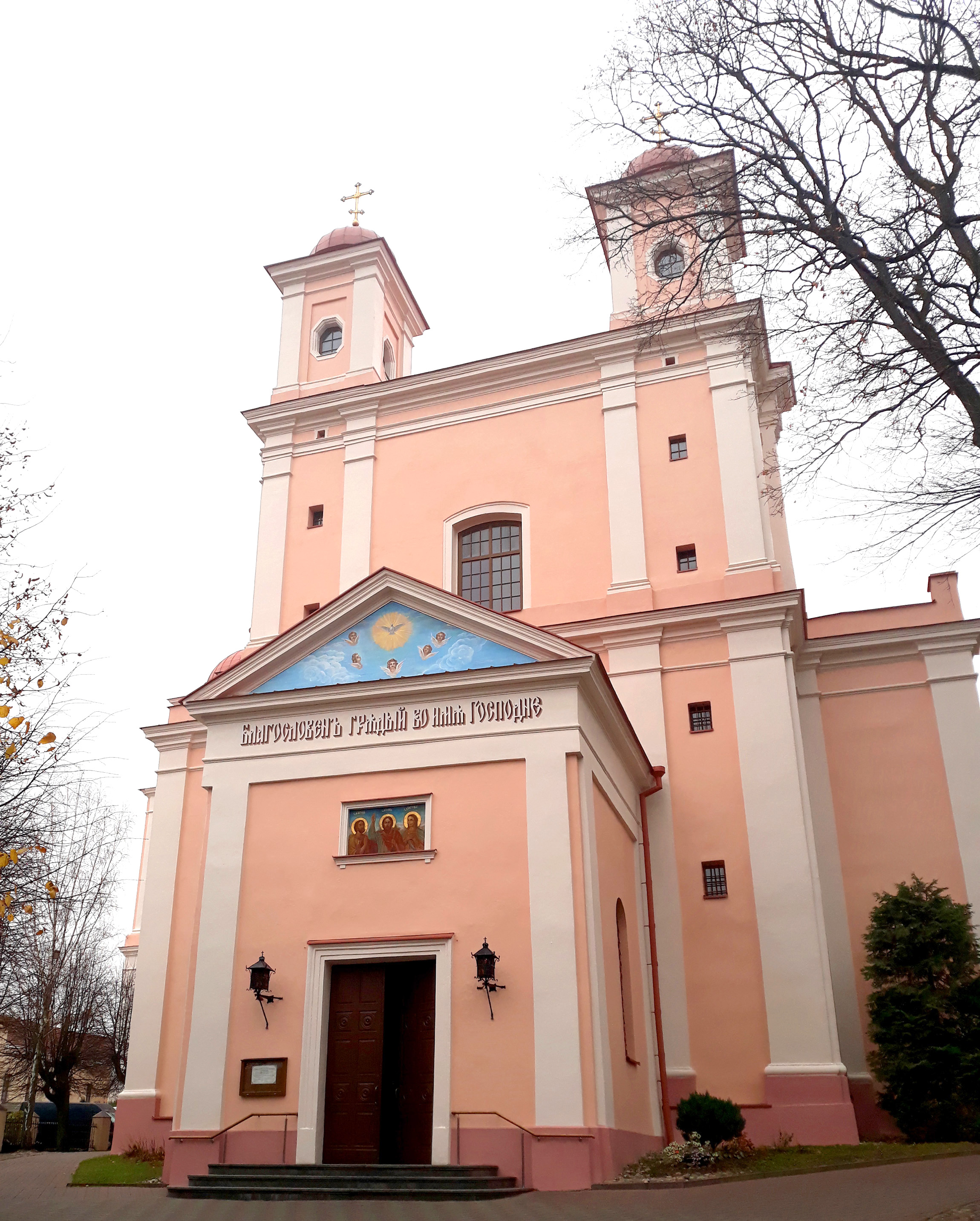
Orthodox Church of the Holy Spirit - exterior

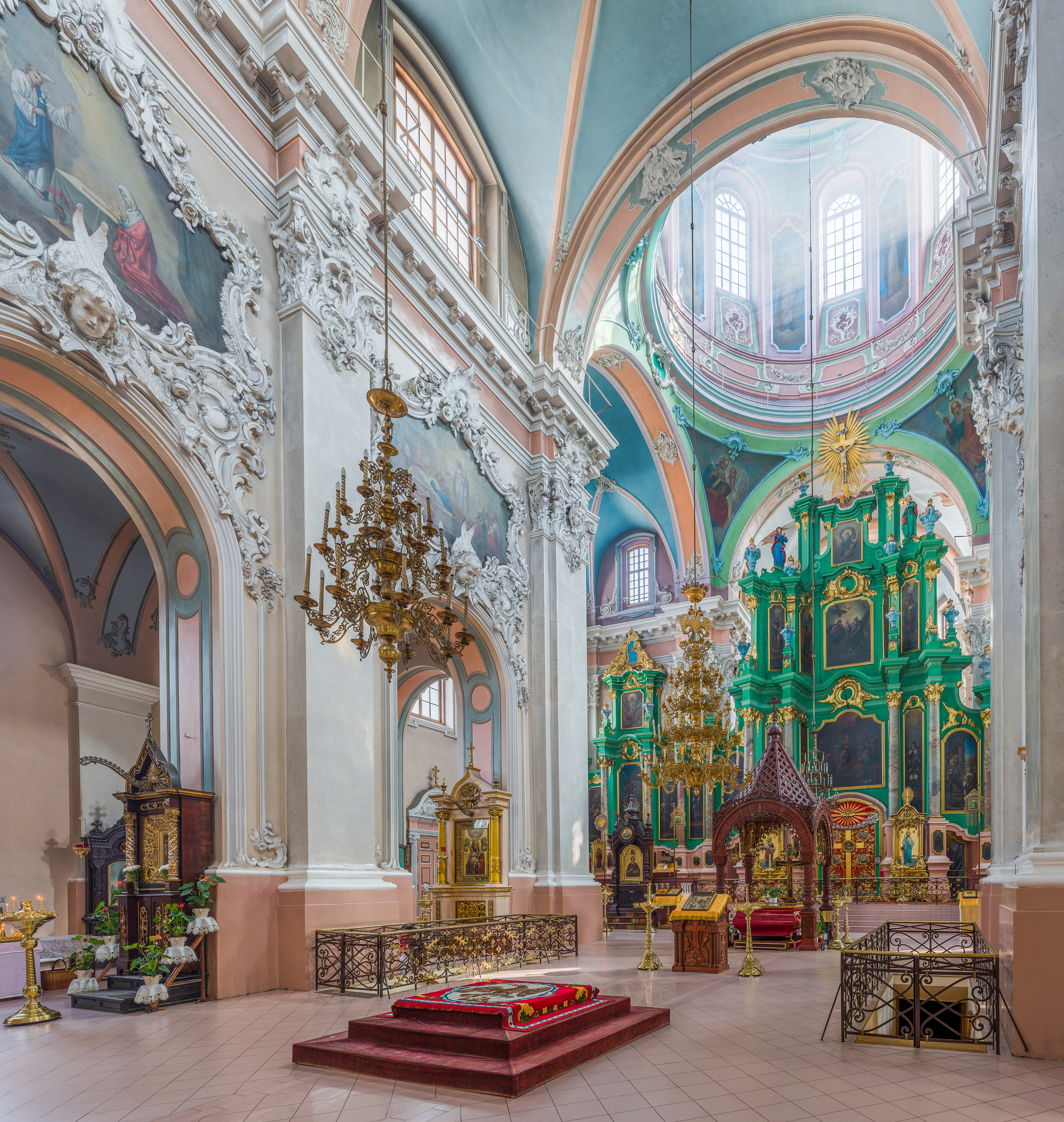
Orthodox Church of the Holy Spirit — interior

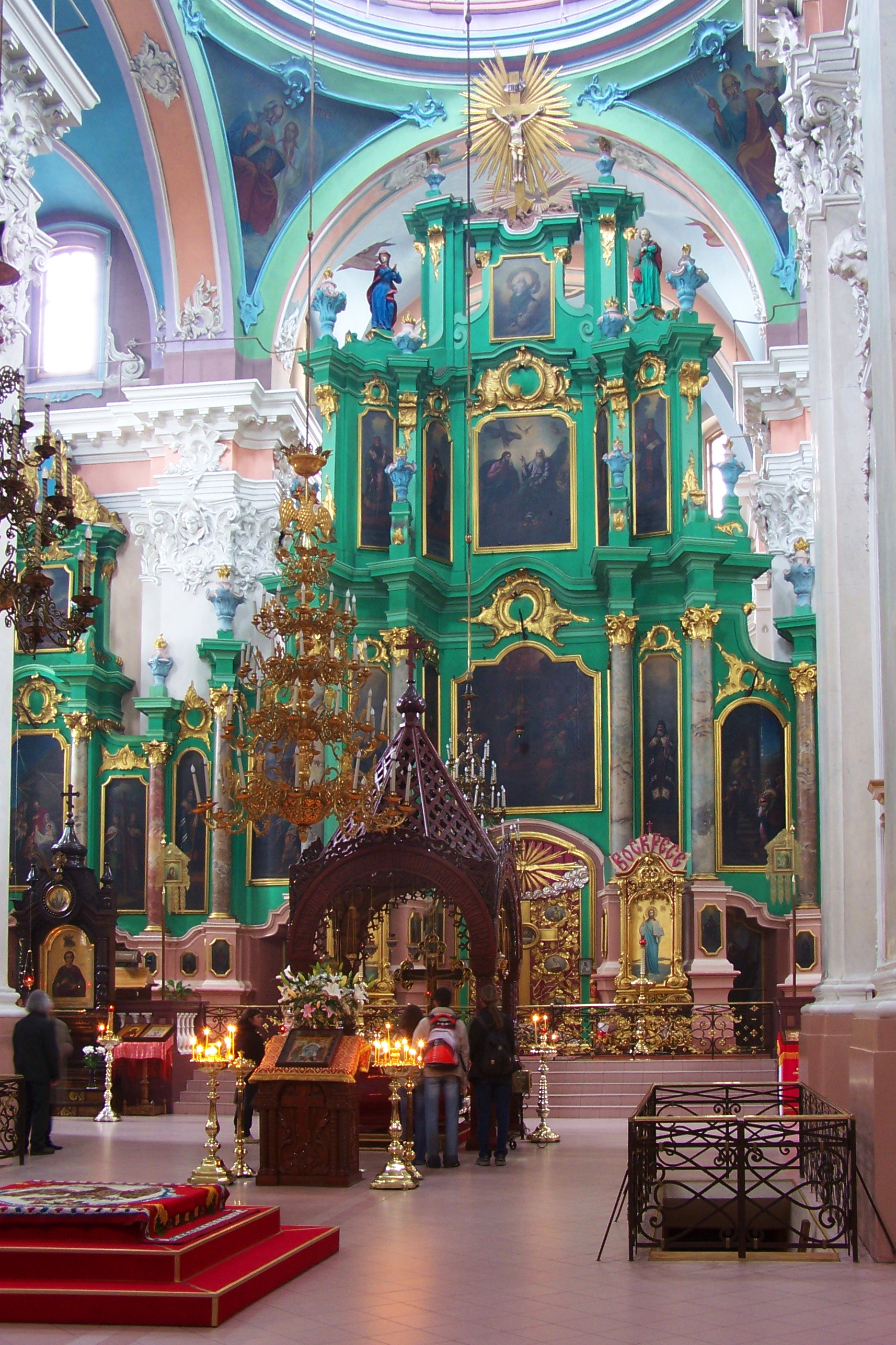
Another view of the Iconostasis

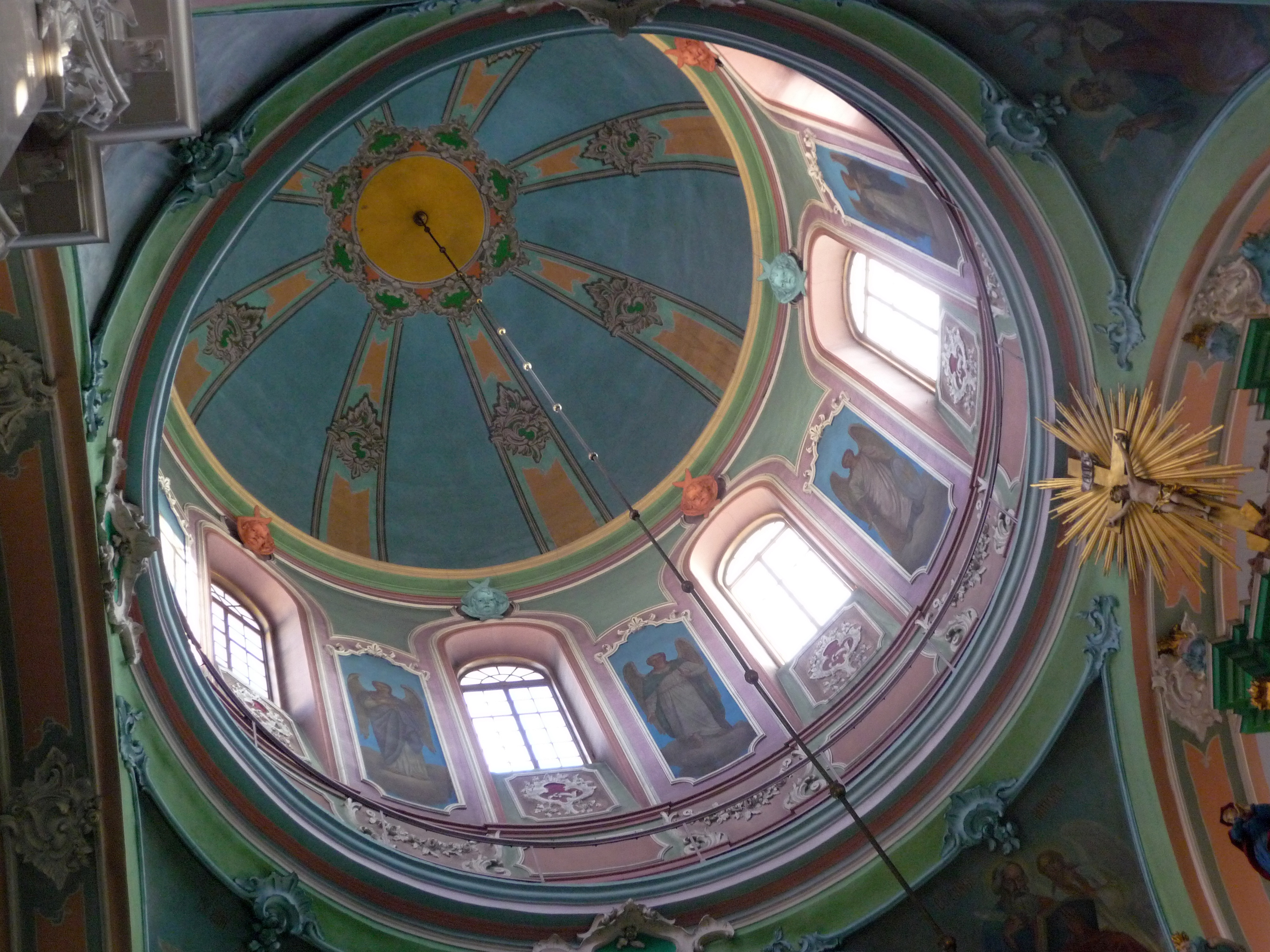
Dome, Church of Holy Spirit, Vilnius

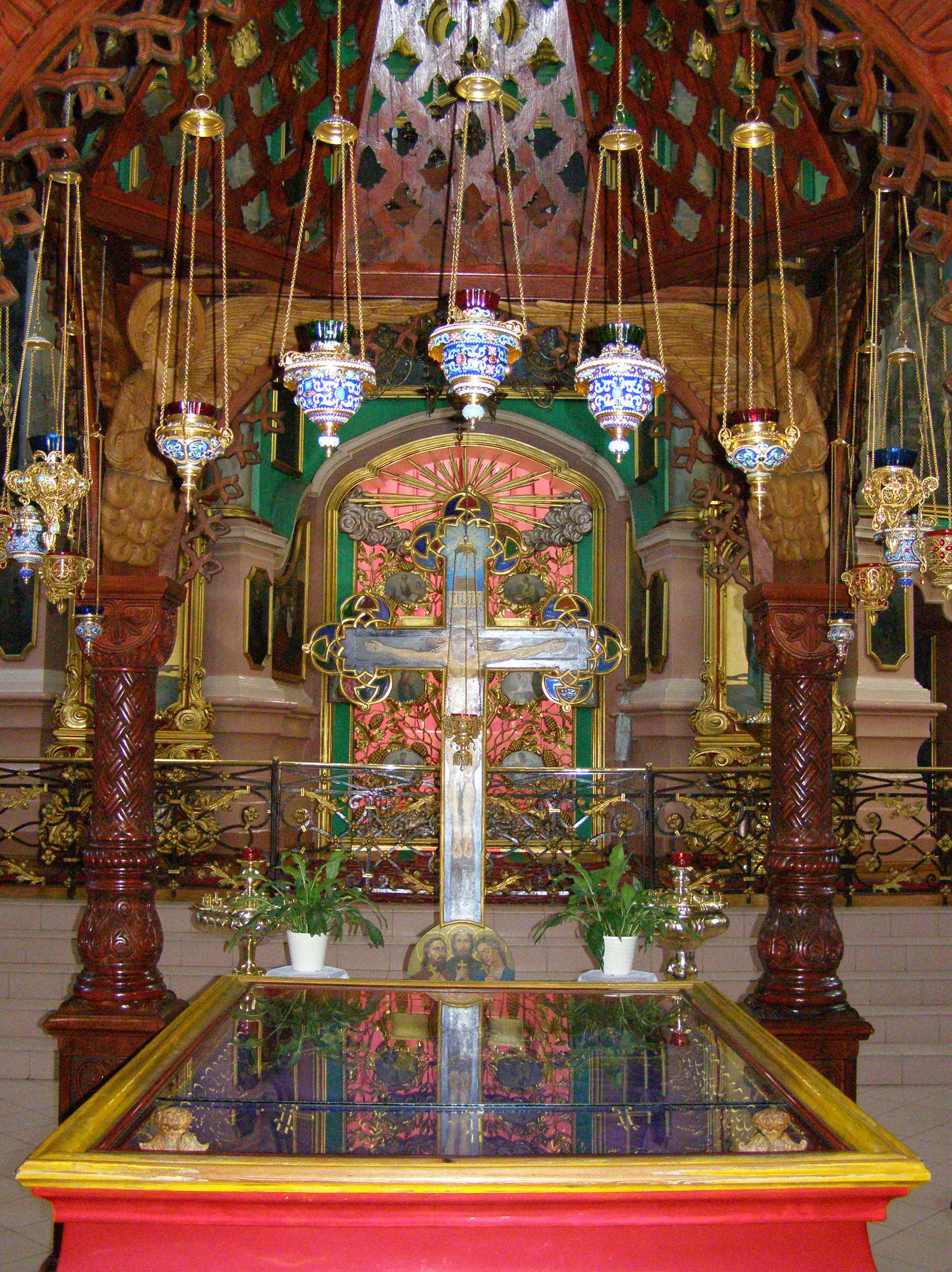
Reliquary of the Martyrs of Vilnius

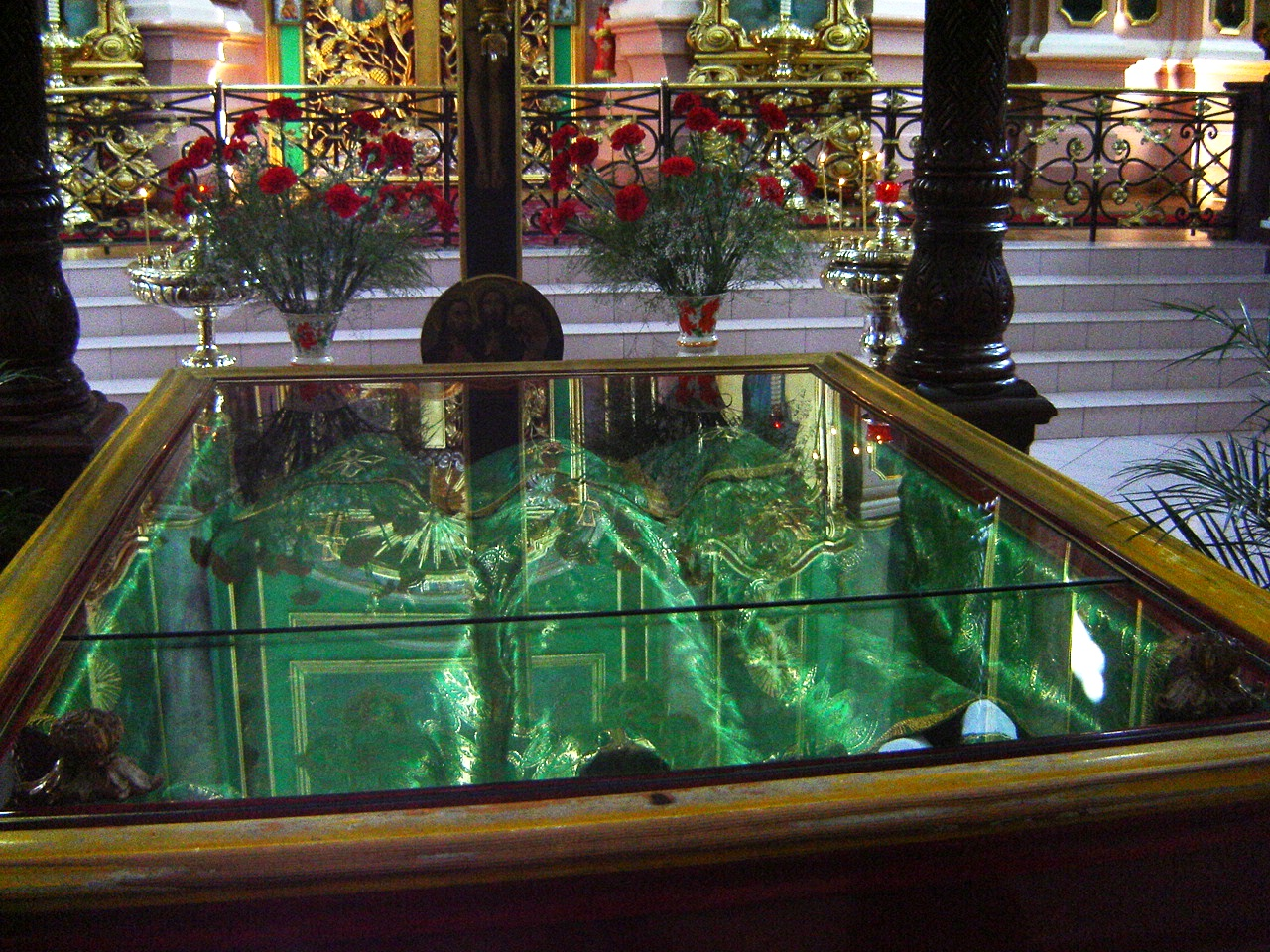
Another view of the relics of the martyrs
