= George Yaroshevsky =

Polish Orthodox bishop

His Eminence Grigory Yaroshevsky
- Metropolitan of Warsaw and all Poland; Metropolita warszawski i całej Polski
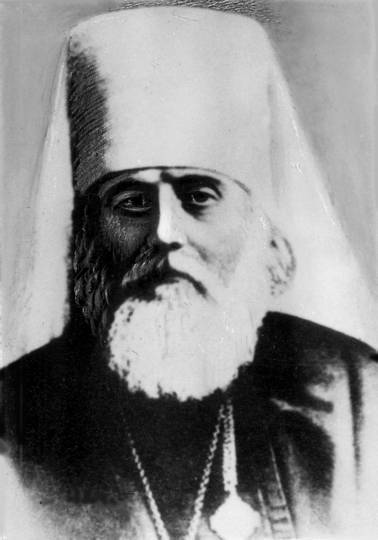
- Church: Polish Orthodox Church
- In office: 1922
- Quashed: 1923
- Predecessor: Position created
- Successor: Dionysius Waledyński

Orders
- Rank: Metropolitan

Personal details
- Born: 30 November [O.S. 18 November] 1872 Murom, Vladimir Governorate, Russian Empire
- Died: February 8, 1923 (aged 50) Warsaw, Second Polish Republic
- Buried: St. John Climacus's Orthodox Church, Warsaw
- Denomination: Eastern Orthodoxy

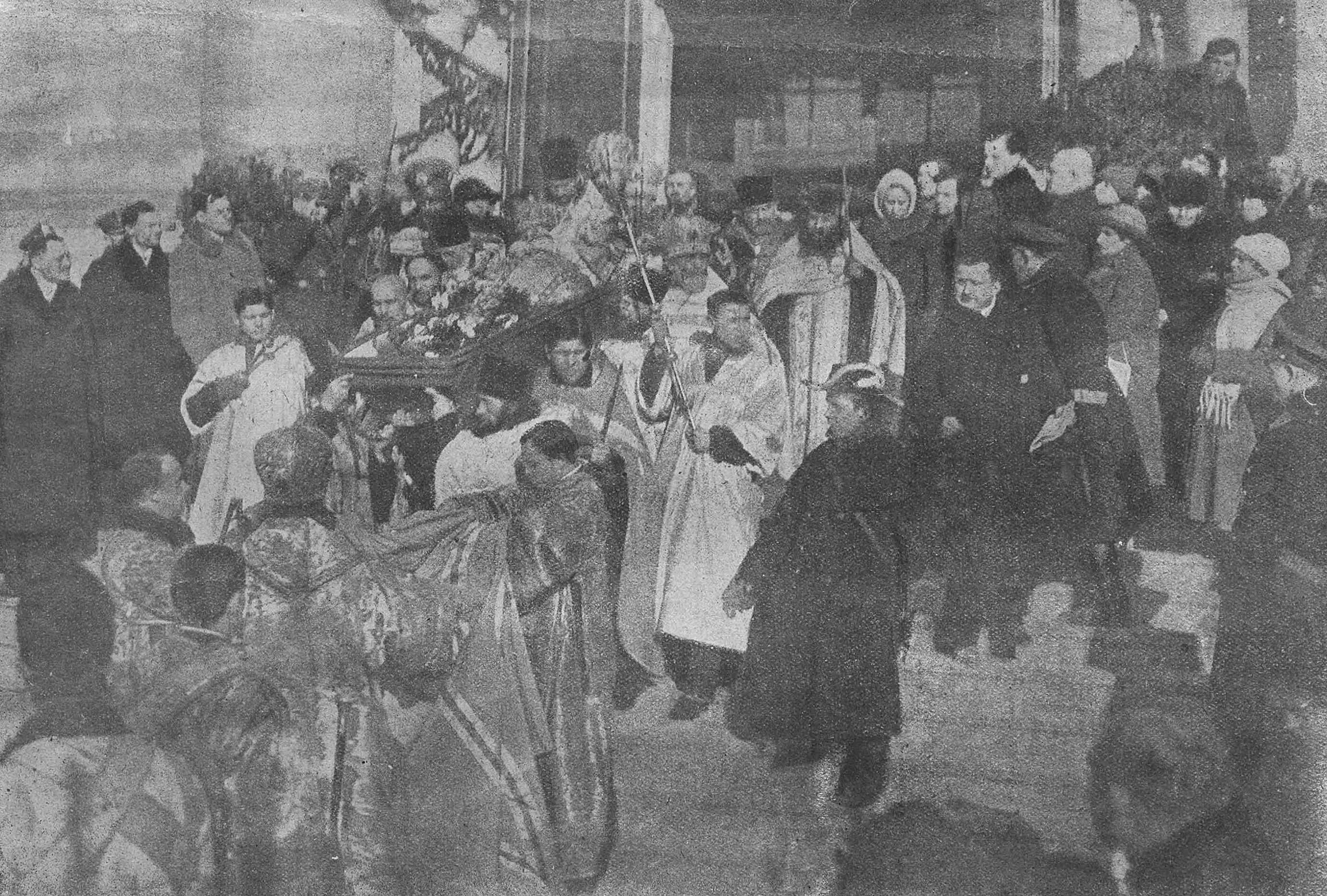
Funeral of Metropolitan George in 1923

Metropolitan George (born Grigory Antonovich Yaroshevsky, Russian: Григорий Антонович Ярошевский; 18/30 November 1872 - 8 February 1923) was the Metropolitan of Warsaw and Russian Patriarchal Exarch in Poland from 11 October 1921 to 8 February 1923.

== Biography ==
He was born in the family of the Orthodox priest Antoniy Yaroshevsky and his wife Dominika in a village of Mala Ternivka (today Ternivka) in Podolia Governorate. His father was a parochial priest in Olhopil parish. George (Yaroshevsky) was an ethnic Ukrainian.

George (Yaroshevsky) was a graduate of the Kyiv Theological Academy as a Candidate of Theology in 1897. In 1900 he was tonsured as a monk and consecrated as a priest (iereus). In 1901 he defended his magistrate dissertation at the Kyiv Theological Academy titled as "Conciliar Epistle of St. Jacob".

George (Yaroshevsky) left the territory of what was Russian Republic for Constantinople and later Serbia. On January 16, 1920, on the “archiereus” cargo steamboat “Irtysh” together with a number of other Russian bishops, archimandrites and priests (together with bishops Eulogius (Georgiyevsky), Mitrofan (Abramov), Gabriel (Chepur) and Apollinarius (Koshevy)) he sailed from Novorossiysk through the occupied by Entente Constantinople and Thessaloniki to Kingdom of Serbs, Croats and Slovenes, emigrating from Russia to what became Yugoslavia.

During occupation of Ukraine by the Armed Forces of South Russia, he was appointed by the Higher Church Administration of South Russia as locum tenens of the eparchy of Kharkiv. In 1920s Archbishop George (Yaroshevsky) was assisting Archbishop Eulogius (Georgiyevsky) in administration of the Russian Orthodox Dioceses in Western Europe.

Earlier, on October 14, 1921, Archbishop George convened a council of bishops in Pochaiv Lavra., whose eparchies found themselves within the borders of independent Poland after World War I. He wanted the congress of hierarchs to agree on their common position on further efforts to achieve autocephaly of the Church in Poland. However, it did not come to fruition, because the bishops who opposed such actions did not submit to the archbishop, who had not been appointed by the patriarch. Only after documents confirming his dignity as exarch reached Poland did these hierarchs begin talks with him on the issue of autocephaly.

In agreement with the government, the metropolitan also made efforts to normalize the legal position of the Orthodox Church in Poland. During the council of bishops, which took place on January 24–30, 1922, a discussion was held on the wording of a provisional legal act on this matter. The government side was represented by Stanisław Piekarski, director of the Department of Religious Affairs, while the Church was represented by the Metropolitan of Warsaw, Bishop of Krzemieniec Dionizy (Waledyński) and Bishop of Pinsk and Novgorod Pantelejmon (Rożnowski). The fourth of the bishops present in Poland, Włodzimierz (Tichonicki), did not come, citing illness as the reason. All those gathered held a discussion on the final wording of the text, after which Metropolitan Jerzy asked the remaining bishops on January 28 for written approval of the resulting document. However, he received it only from Archbishop Dionizy of Krzemieniec. Both Bishop Pantelejmon and later Bishop Włodzimierz considered the presented project to be inconsistent with canon law and refused to sign. These hierarchs were of the opinion that the provisions contained in the Temporary Regulations... make Polish Orthodoxy dependent on the state. Despite this, on January 30, 1922, the Minister of Religious Denominations and Public Enlightenment Antoni Ponikowski approved the project, and on February 23 of the same year, in a letter to the voivodes and Orthodox bishops, he informed that the provisions of the document had entered into force. For refusing to sign the Temporary Regulations... Bishop Panteleimon was forced to resign from his dignity. In connection with this, Bishop Włodzimierz, after initial hesitation, decided to accept the document.

On May 30, 1922, a council of Orthodox bishops was held in Poland, attended by Metropolitan Jerzy, Archbishops Dionysius (Waledyński) and Eleutherius Bogoyavlensky, and Bishop Vladimir Tikhonicky. Metropolitan George presented a resolution at the meeting, which stated that Polish bishops would make all decisions without waiting for instructions from Moscow, where on May 11 Patriarch Tikhon formally resigned from the leadership of the Church in favour of the Higher Church Administration of the Living Church. He did not agree to introduce an amendment to the text, which would make decisions on the most important matters dependent on the unanimity of the bishops. Since opponents of autocephaly left the meeting and two other hierarchs (bishops Panteleimon (Rozhnovsky) and Sergius (Korolyov) were absent, the resolution was adopted only by the votes of Metropolitan George and Archbishop Dionysius. In order to avoid similar situations in the future, both of the aforementioned ordained a supporter of autocephaly, Archimandrite Alexander (Inozemtsov), as a bishop. In the next council of bishops, which took place in the same place on June 14, 1922, Metropolitan George, Archbishop Dionysius and Bishop Alexander decided to apply for autocephaly from the Patriarchate of Constantinople. This time, the congress was held without the participation of opponents of the independence of Polish Orthodoxy. Despite the consistency of the metropolitan's actions, Archbishop Eleutherius and Bishop Vladimir did not submit to the decisions of the council, still counting on the possibility of the territory of Poland remaining under the jurisdiction of the Patriarch of Moscow and all Rus'. In their dioceses, they openly opposed their superior, negatively disposed the clergy and the faithful towards him and did not mention his name during the Holy Liturgy. Patriarch Tikhon also spoke negatively about the metropolitan's activity, although he did not speak about it publicly, as did the Russian Orthodox Church Outside of Russia, whose superior, Metropolitan Antony Khrapovitsky, demanded detailed explanations regarding the situation in Poland. However, he did not receive them, because the council of bishops in Poland did not recognize the Foreign Church as a canon.

On 8 February 1923 George (Yaroshevsky) was assassinated by Archimandrite of the Russian Orthodox Church Smaragd (Latyshenko).

== Bishopric appointments of George (Yaroshevsky) ==
- 1906 – ordained as a vicar bishop of Kashira of the Tula Eparchy
- 1 February 1908 a vicar bishop of Pryluky of the Poltava Eparchy
- 19 November 1910 a vicar bishop of Yamburg of the Saint Petersburg Eparchy and a rector of the Saint Petersburg Theological Academy
- 13 May 1913 bishop of Kaluga and Borovsk
- 6 July 1916 bishop of Minsk and Turov
- 1918 became an archbishop
- 11 October 1921 archbishop of Warsaw, Patriarchal Exarch in Poland
- 30 January 1922 became a metropolitan

== Works ==
- Conciliar Epistle of St. Jacob: Experience of isagogy-exegetical research (Соборное послание Св. Апостола Иакова: Опыт исагогико-экзегетического исследования.) Kyiv, 1901. Magisterial dissertation. (in Russian)
