= Anthony, John, and Eustathius =

Eastern Orthodox martyrs of Vilnius

Saints Anthony, John, and Eustathius of Vilnius
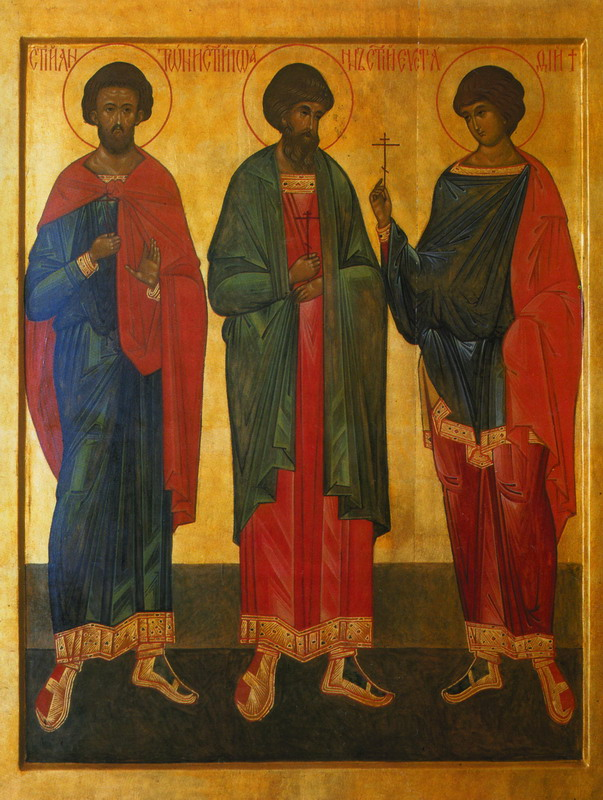
- A medieval Orthodox icon of the Martyrs of Vilnius

Martyrs
- Died: 1347; Vilnius, Lithuania
- Venerated in: Eastern Orthodox Church; Roman Catholic Church
- Feast: 14 April
- Patronage: Vilnius

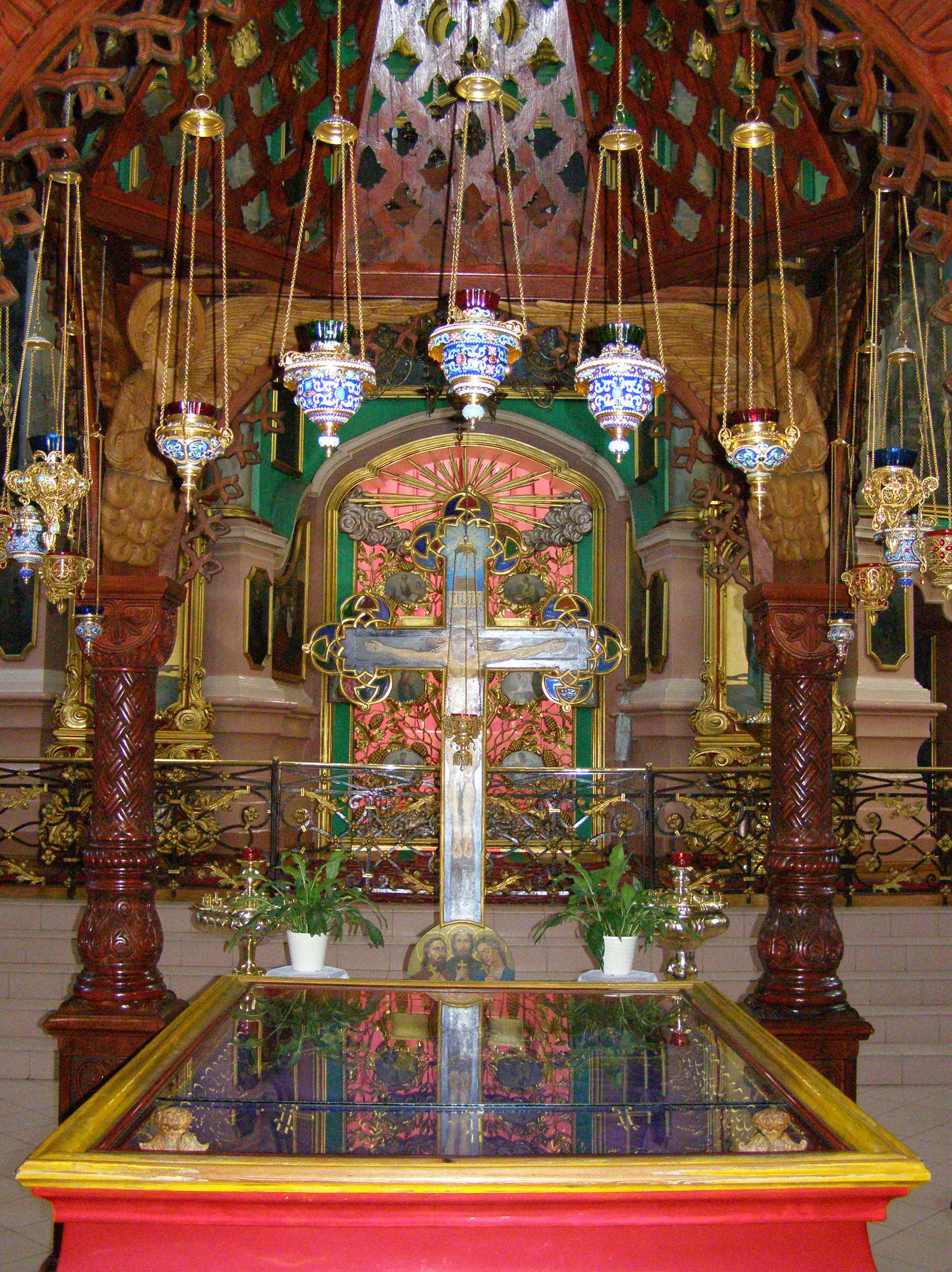
Covered bodies of the martyrs on display in the Orthodox Church of the Holy Spirit in Vilnius

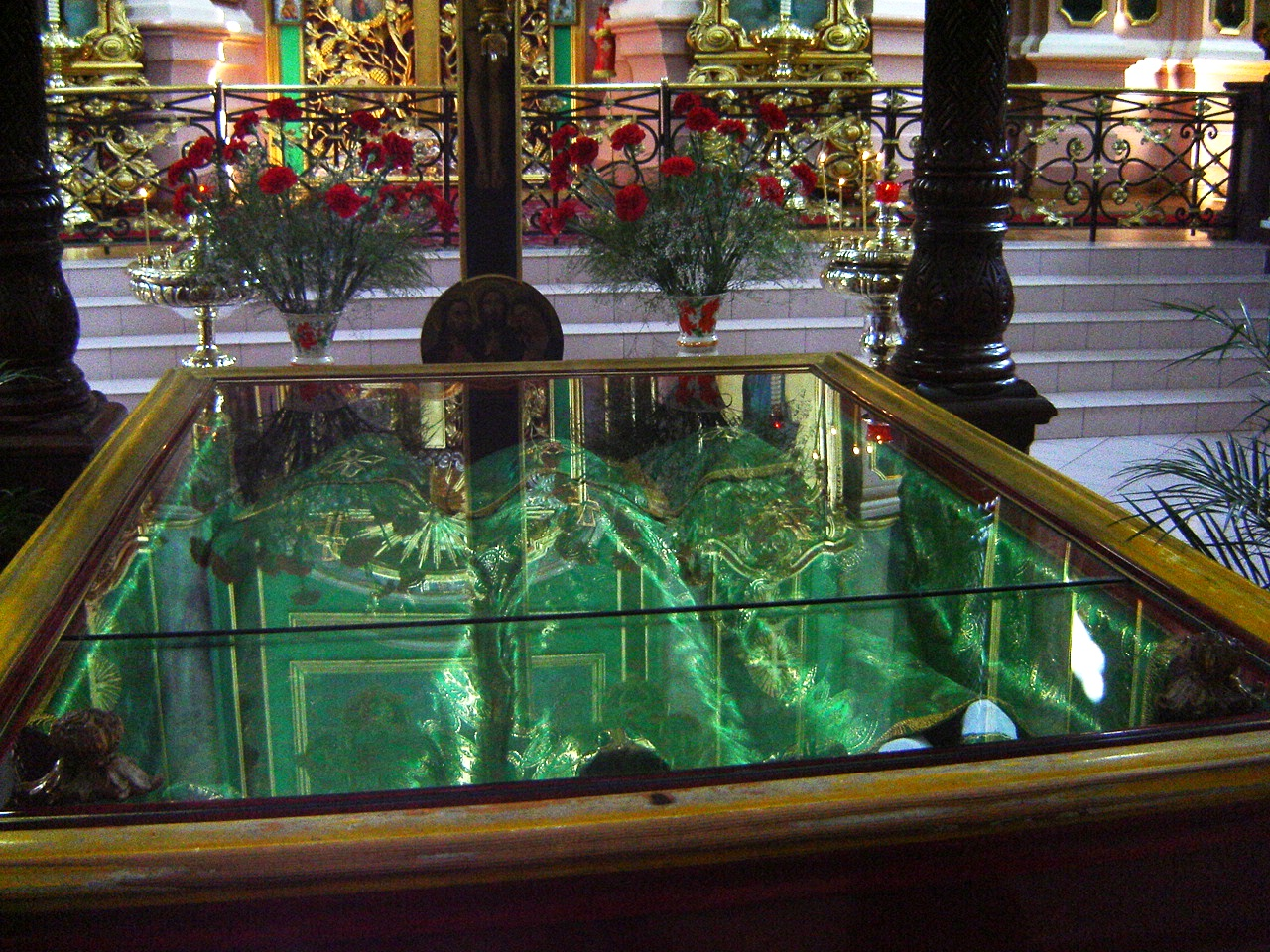
Another view of the relics of the martyrs

Anthony, John, and Eustathius (Eustathios, Eustace; Russian: Антоний, Иоанн and Евстафий, Lithuanian: Antanas, Jonas ir Eustachijus; Martyrs of Vilnius, Russian: Виленские мученики, Lithuanian: Vilniaus kankiniai) are saints and martyrs of the Eastern Orthodox Church. Their feast day is celebrated on 14 April in the horologion. They are also commemorated in the Monastery of the Holy Spirit in Vilnius each year on 13 July. Eastern Orthodoxy commemorates them with the 4th Tone Troparion and 3rd Tone Kontakion⠀⠀

== Life ==
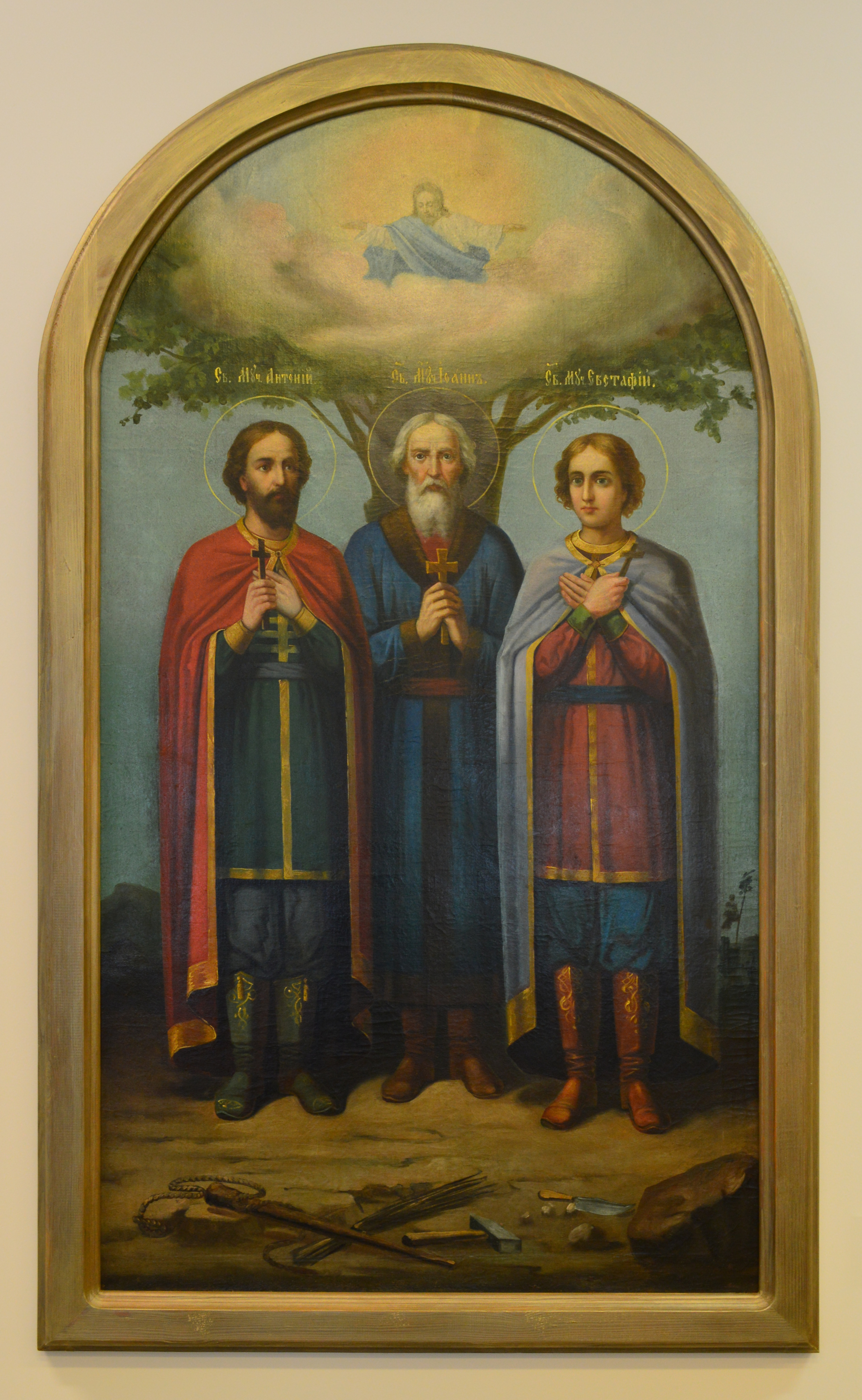
Another Orthodox Icon of the Martyrs of Vilnius

Originally named Kumetis, Nežilas, and Krulis, the three martyrs were Lithuanian converts to Christianity from Baltic paganism who served in the court of Algirdas, the Grand Duke of Lithuania. Kumetis and Nežilas were brothers, while Krulis was their cousin.

Algirdas had been wed to the Orthodox princess, Maria of Vitebsk, who brought an Orthodox priest named Nestor with her. Maria requested an Orthodox church to be built, and it was in this church that the converts were baptized by Nestor, who gave them the names Anthony (for Kumetis), John (for Nežilas), and Eustathius (for Krulis). After the death of Maria, Algirdas again openly supported paganism, including pagan priests who were persecuting Christians.

John and Anthony did not participate in pagan worship, were seen observing Orthodox fasting, and did not cut their hair or beards like the pagans. The Lithuanian nobles became suspicious of John and Anthony, so they interrogated them. When they were ordered by Algirdas to eat meat, they refused because it was during Great Lent, when Orthodox Christians refrain from eating meat.

At their refusal, they were tortured and imprisoned. On April 14, 1347, Anthony was hanged on an oak tree sacred to the pagans. John was later swarmed by a large crowd of people and strangled to death. His body was hung on the same one as Anthony's on April 24, 1347. Christians buried both of their bodies in the Church of Saint Nicholas in Vilnius. Eustathius was sentenced to death and hanged on December 13, 1347, on the same oak tree. The Monastery of the Holy Trinity was later built on the site where the three men died.

== Veneration ==
Soon, their relics were declared to be incorrupt. In 1364, Patriarch Philotheus of Constantinople (1354-1355, 1364-1376) sent a cross with the relics of the holy martyrs to Saint Sergius of Radonezh. Soon their bodies were put in a glass reliquary in the crypt chapel under the altar of the cathedral in the Monastery of the Holy Spirit in Vilnius, Lithuania. In 1915, during the German invasion, these relics were taken to Moscow. In 1947, the relics were brought back to Vilnius and rested again in the crypt chapel under the altar of the cathedral. In 1997, the relics were brought back to the Monastery of the Holy Spirit in Vilnius, Lithuania. Their relics, said to be incorruptible, have since been moved to the cathedral's main sanctuary.

== Literature ==
- Florya, B. N.; Shlevis, G. (2001). "Антоний, Иоанн и Евстафий" [Anthony, John, and Eustathius]. Православная энциклопедия. II : Алексий, человек Божий — Анфим Анхиальский. Moskva: Православная энциклопедия. pp. 666–668. ISBN 5-89572-007-2.
- Meyendorff, John, The Three Lithuanian Martyrs: Byzantium and Lithuania in the Fourteenth Century. St. Vladimir Theological Quarterly, 26 (1982), 29–44
