= Monastery of St. Mary Magdalene =

Orthodox female monastery in Vilnius, Lithuania

Monastery of St. Mary Magdalene in Vilnius
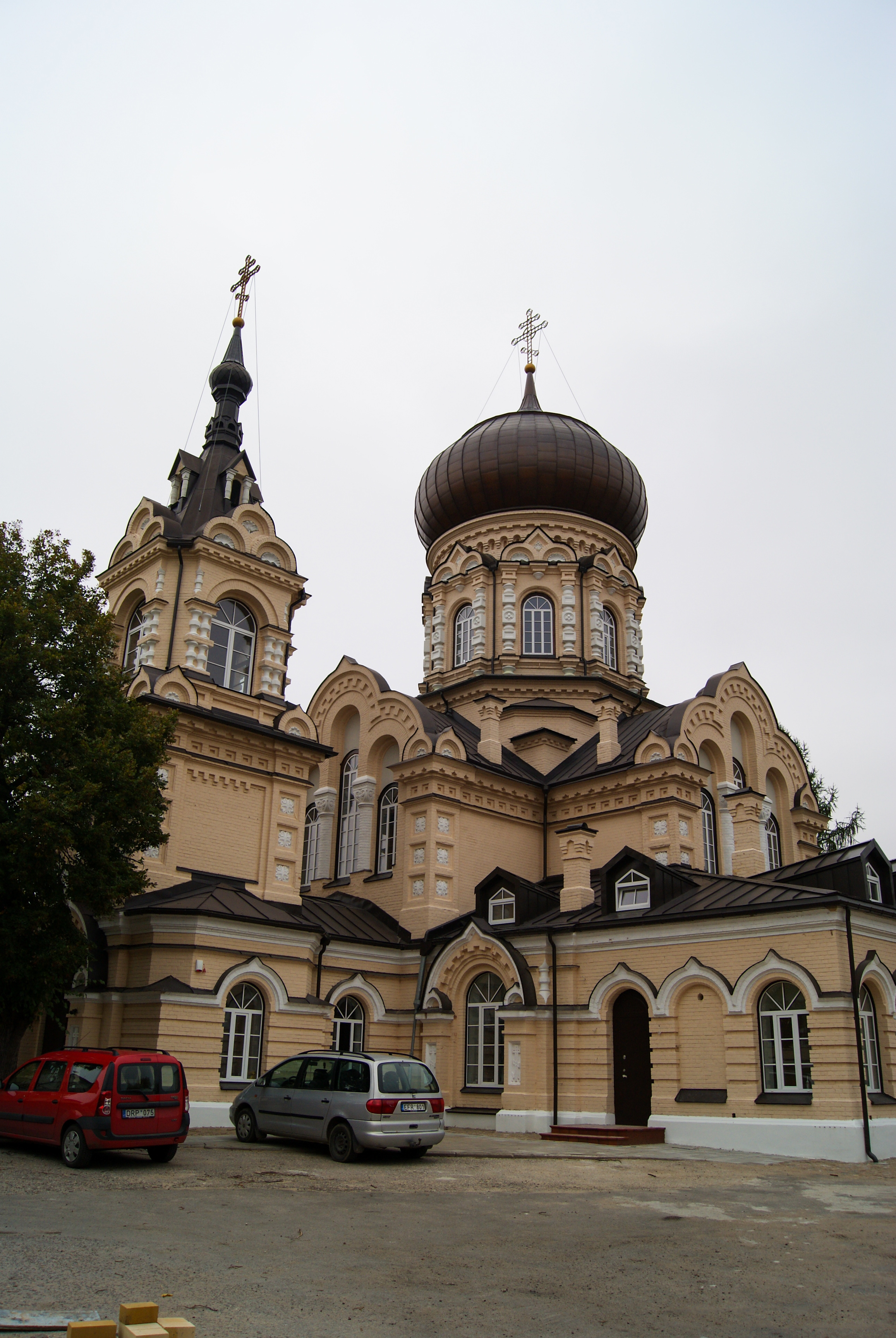
- Monastic Orthodox Church of St. Alexander Nevsky

- Location within Lithuania

Monastery information
- Order: none
- Denomination: Russian Orthodox Church
- Dedication: Church of St. Alexander Nevsky
- Diocese: Russian Orthodox Diocese of Lithuania

People
- Founder: Alexander II of Russia
- House superior: Serafina (Iwanowa)

Architecture
- Completed date: 1865

Site
- Location: Vilnius
- Country: Lithuania
- Coordinates: 54°39′57.41″N 25°17′13.55″E

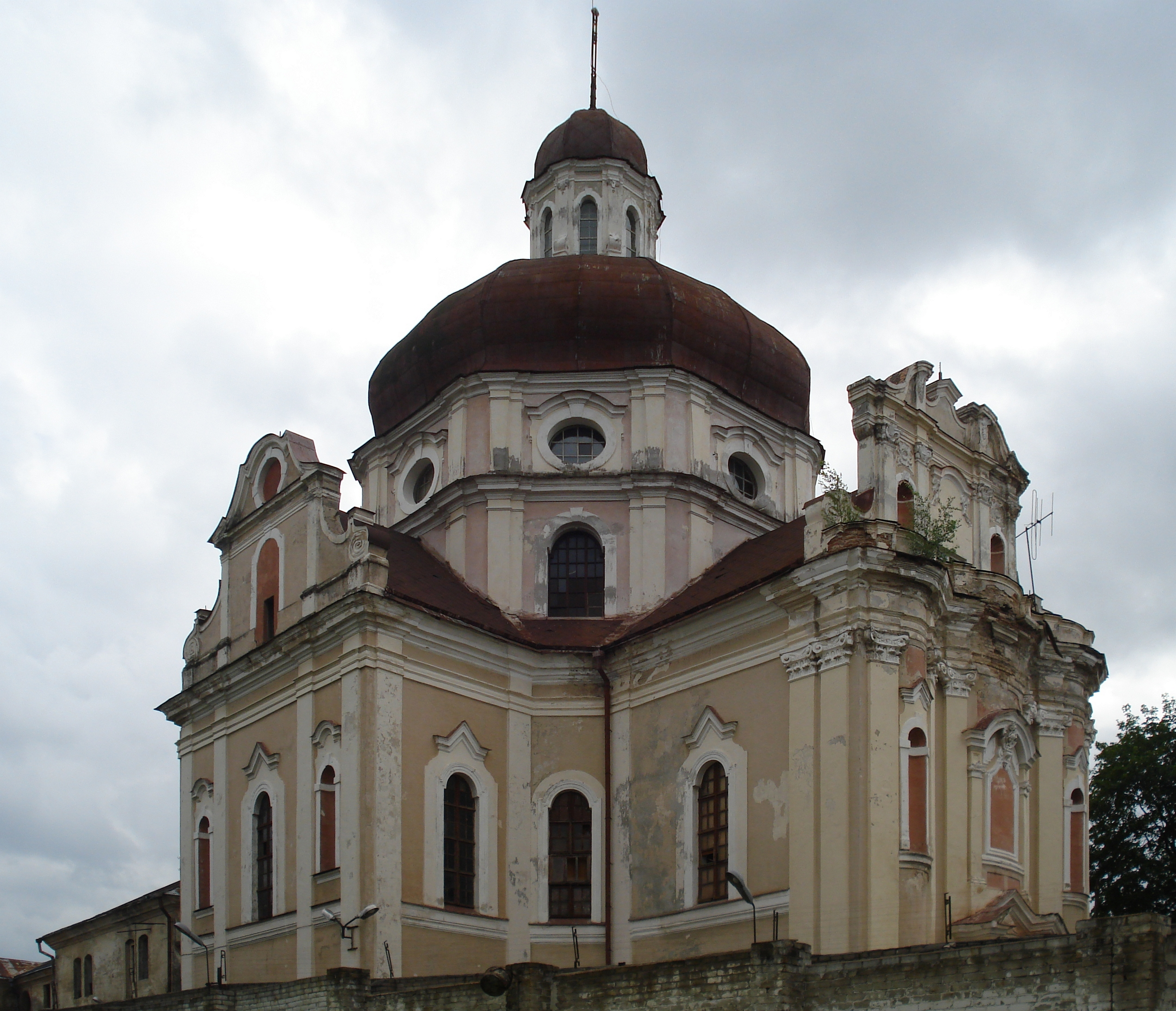
Church of the Sacred Heart of Jesus in Vilnius taken away from the Visitation nuns by the tsarist authorities for use as the monastery of St. Mary Magdalene

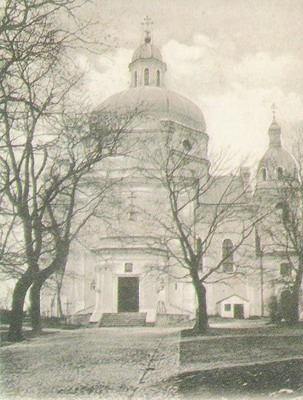
View of the Church of the Sacred Heart of Jesus converted to the monastery church of St. Mary Magdalene

The Monastery of St. Mary Magdalene is an Orthodox female monastery in Vilnius. Since 1923, the only women's monastery in the Russian Orthodox Diocese of Lithuania. Established by imperial decree on 9 November 1864, during the intensification of Russification in the former territories of the Polish–Lithuanian Commonwealth, it initially occupied the buildings of the former Order of the Visitation of Holy Mary on Ross' Street. Its church was adapted into the monastic Church of St. Mary Magdalene. The Vilnius community consisted of nuns from the St. Alexis Convent in Moscow, who ran a school, an orphanage, as well as workshops for making liturgical vestments and writing icons at the monastery. The monastery operated until 1915 when, succumbing to the panic fueled by Tsarist propaganda, the residing nuns (114 nuns and novices) left the monastery, opting for exile.

After World War I, the Visitation nuns returned to Vilnius, regaining their convent on Ross' Street. Upon the initiative of Bishop Eleutherius Bogojawleński of Vilnius and Lithuania, Orthodox nuns moved to one of the buildings of the Monastery of the Holy Trinity in Vilnius, and in 1937 to the former school buildings near the Church of St. Alexander Nevsky. They were forced to leave by the Soviet authorities in 1960. From then on, the monastic community resided in one of the wings of the complex of the Monastery of the Holy Spirit in Vilnius; the return to the original location took place in 2015.

== History ==
=== In the Russian Empire ===
==== Establishment of the monastery ====
The establishment of the women's monastery in Vilnius was connected with the Russification campaign in the Lithuanian lands through the promotion of Russia's state religion – Eastern Orthodoxy. At the time of its founding, it was the third monastic community of this denomination in Vilnius, alongside the male monasteries of the Holy Spirit and the Holy Trinity. The founding document of the Monastery of St. Mary Magdalene dates back to 9 November 1864. The order in this matter was personally signed by Tsar Alexander II. Orthodox nuns, according to it, took over the Order of the Visitation of Holy Mary, which was simultaneously dissolved. According to the monastery's chronicle written in 1965 by Sister Barbara (Trofimowa), the Visitation nuns were allowed to leave the country along with most of the movable property. The establishment of the monastery was blessed by the Orthodox Metropolitan of Vilnius and Lithuania, Joseph Semashko. Metropolitan Philaret Drozdov of Moscow was also particularly involved in its creation. According to the founding charter, the nuns were to run an orphanage at the monastery, which was opened on July 22 (Note: Date according to the Gregorian calendar – August 4.) of the following year.

The nuns who established the Monastery of St. Mary Magdalene came from the St. Alexis Convent in Moscow. The first abbess was nun Flaviana Popova. On October 22, Bishop Ignatius Żelezowski of Brest, in accordance with the resolution of the Most Holy Synod, bestowed upon her the dignity of hegumeness. Hegumeness Flaviana, over the next few years, carried out a thorough renovation of the buildings previously belonging to the Visitation nuns, coupled with the transformation of the monastic Church of the Sacred Heart of Jesus in Vilnius into the Church of St. Mary Magdalene.

In addition to the reconstruction of the main temple during the works, a second church was arranged, dedicated to the Protection of the Mother of God, and part of the residential buildings was adapted into accommodations for the orphanage. The hegumeness fully enforced the monastery rule's provisions upon the sisters (including those who came from Moscow), formed a choir from them, and herself engaged in the work of the orphanage from 1868 (i.e., from the admission of the first wards). She was the director of the orphanage. She also led the school of painting established at the monastery. The icons, complete iconostases, and other works created by the nuns and the wards of the orphanage were used in churches in Vilnius and beyond. Another workshop run by the nuns dealt with sewing liturgical garments. For exemplary management of the newly established monastery, Hegumeness Flaviana was awarded the right to wear a pectoral cross in 1871. In 1877, for the same reason, she was nominated for the award of a cross with ornaments, but she did not live to receive it (she died in 1878).

==== Activity of the monastery until the time of emigration ====
After the death of Hegumeness Flaviana, her duties were taken over by nun Antonina Zołotariowa, who arrived with her from Moscow. She received the title of hegumeness from Archbishop Macarius Bulgakov of the Russian Orthodox Diocese of Lithuania less than two months after formally assuming the position on 22 June 1878. This nun remained at the helm of the community until 1900, when she resigned due to old age. She died in the monastery four years later. Archbishop Juwenaliusz Połowcew of the Russian Orthodox Diocese of Lithuania appointed Hegumeness Moiseyeva (Lalina), who was brought from another monastery, as her successor. She initiated a comprehensive renovation of the monastery buildings, during which the churches were lined with marble, a new altar was installed in the main church, and all of them were enriched with new icons. During the tenure of Hegumeness Moiseyeva, the nuns ran a school for 40 daughters of clergy or government officials working in the western and northern parts of the Russian Empire. The icon-painting workshop continued its work.

According to a description in a Russian guidebook to Vilnius published in the early 20th century, the monastery was situated in an extremely picturesque location, and the complex of buildings occupied by the nuns was surrounded by a well-kept orchard. The activity of the school run by the nuns and the level of singing in the monastery church were also highly praised.

In 1912, when the hegumeness resigned from her position at her own request, there were 89 nuns in the monastery. The Most Holy Synod appointed nun Vera (Potapienko) as the new hegumeness, who had previously lived in one of the monasteries in St. Petersburg. In 1914, she organized a hospital for 15 soldiers at the monastery.

==== Departure from Vilnius ====
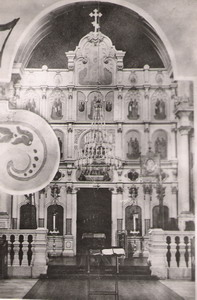
Iconostasis in the main church of the monastery

On July 22 (August 4 according to the Gregorian calendar) 1915, Metropolitan Tikhon of Moscow conducted the final Divine Liturgy in the monastery's Church of St. Mary Magdalene. On September 14 of the same year, the nuns and the children under their care, fleeing from the front, embarked on a journey of emigration. A total of 114 nuns and students left the monastery, taking their movable property with them. Initially, they went to Minsk, and after a month, to Petrograd. In Petrograd, the group split: those nuns who wished to do so went to their relatives, while others remained in various monasteries in the capital of Russia. Meanwhile, the shelter continued to operate in its previous form. Fifty nuns, along with their Mother Superior, were transferred to the Monastery of St. Mary Magdalene in Vokhonovo near Tsarskoye Selo. In 1918, nun Vera (Potapienko) was elevated to the rank of hegumeness.

In 1918, Hegumeness Vera fell ill and resigned from her position, after which she went to her family in Finland. She was succeeded by Hegumeness Nina Bataszowa. She, too, decided to return to Vilnius with some of the nuns (about 20 people). In the same year, she obtained permission for this from Patriarch Tikhon of Moscow and all Russia. However, upon the arrival of the nuns in Lithuanian lands, it turned out that the monastery buildings were occupied for the needs of the German army, and the nuns could only inhabit a few rooms in the complex of buildings. They also lost this part when, in 1919, the Visitation nuns legally regained their former property.

=== In the Second Polish Republic ===
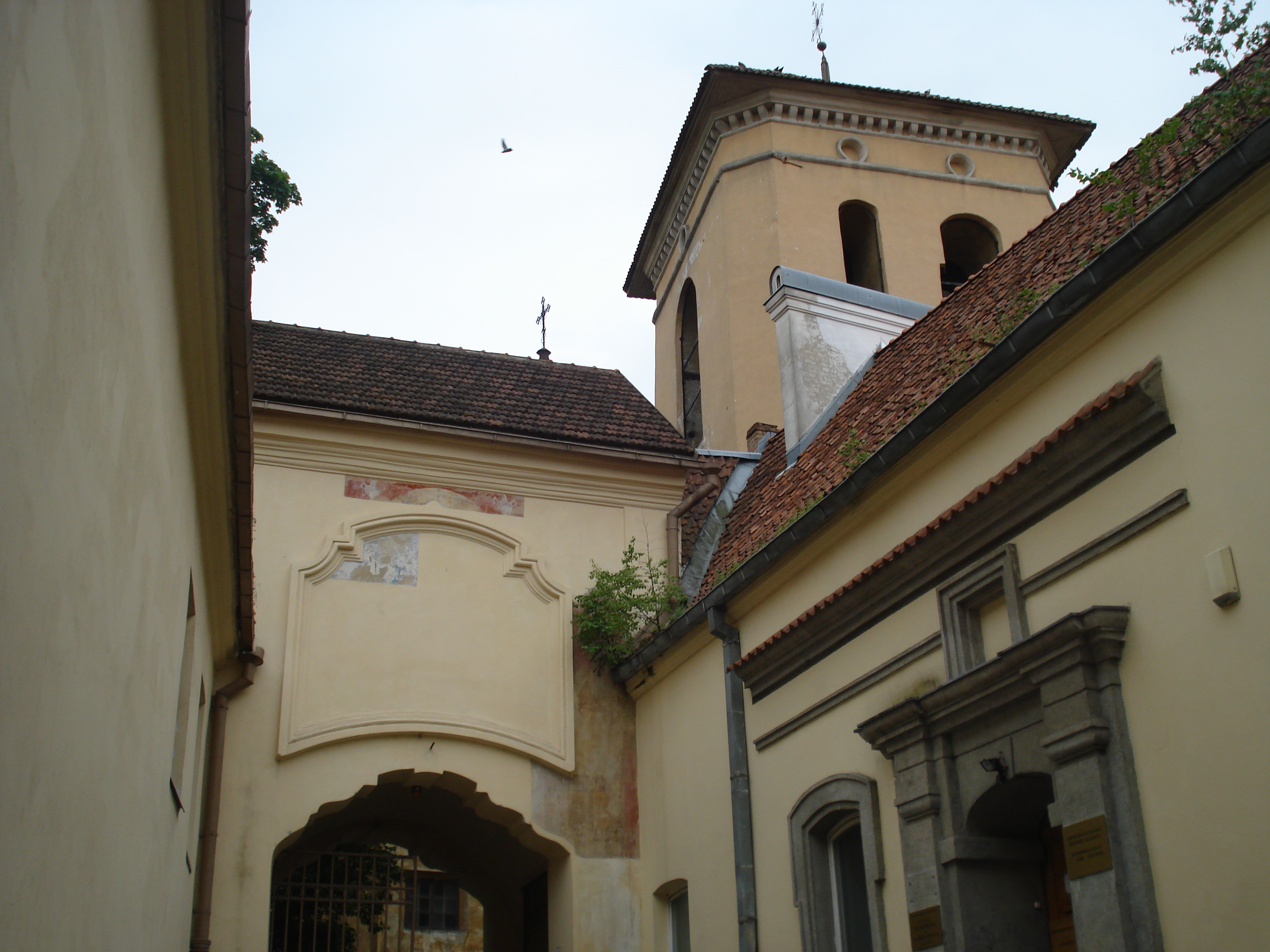
The buildings of the Monastery of the Holy Trinity in Vilnius

Not wanting to allow the community to disperse, Bishop Eleutherius Bogojawleński of the Russian Orthodox Diocese of Lithuania allowed Sister Nina and the remaining sisters to settle in the buildings of the Holy Trinity male monastery, located on Ostrobramska Street in the center of the Old Town. The material situation of the monastery was much more difficult than before World War I. The nuns lost their landed estates granted to them before the war by the tsarist authorities, which were confiscated by Catholic institutions or Polish owners. They were left with only 240 hectares of forest in the Wiatrówka estate, which was a donation from Russian state forests, and 67 hectares of land with a summer house near Nemenczyn. Despite this, the monastery's chronicle reports that normal community life, despite all the difficulties, was restored. The nuns held the Vilnius icon of the Mother of God in special reverence. This is confirmed by the fact that in 1921, Patriarch Tikhon of Moscow confirmed the election of Sister Nina (Bataszowa) as the head of the monastery and rewarded her with the right to wear a pectoral cross. On November 8 of the same year, Archbishop Eleutherius of the Russian Orthodox Diocese of Lithuania bestowed upon her the rank of hegumeness.

Partly due to the circumstances of its establishment, the Polish authorities considered the Orthodox female monastery in Vilnius unnecessary and sought its liquidation. As a result, the nuns were charged a high rent for the use of the buildings of the Monastery of the Holy Trinity, which was also nationalized after World War I, but leased to several Orthodox monastic communities. From 1928 to 1931, Hegumeness Nina (Bataszowa) held negotiations with the authorities regarding the partial forgiveness of the debt. She requested a grant to the monastery in the amount of 2768.28 zlotys and committed to repay it in 18 installments. Supported by the Warsaw metropolitans – first by George Yaroshevsky, then by Dionysius Waledyński – the head of the community consistently requested since 1918 permission to merge the female monastic communities of St. Mary Magdalene in Vilnius and Berezwecz (Note: Berezwecz Monastery, founded in 1901, was liquidated in 1923 (reactivated in independent Belarus in 2004).) and to allow them to take over the Church of St. Michael Archistrategus in Vilnius along with the buildings of the former school. However, the Ministry of National Education ruled that there were no grounds for the Orthodox Church to take over these properties.

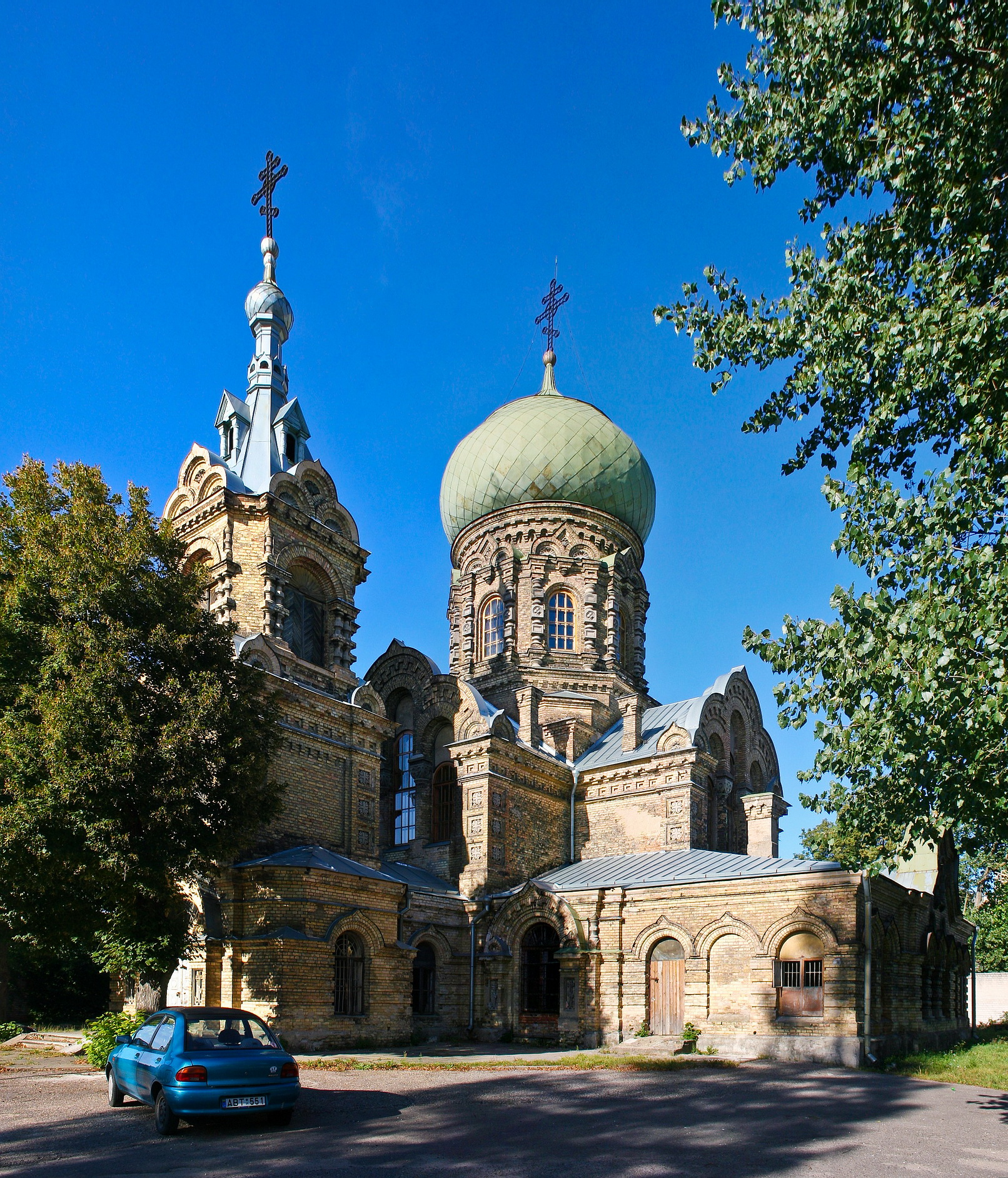
Church of St. Alexander Nevsky in Vilnius – a monastic temple from 1937 to 1959 and again from 2015

The efforts of Hegumeness Nina to obtain permission to conduct fundraising for the construction of a new monastery from scratch, where the nuns could reside, also ended in failure. The Governor of Vilnius wrote:

The matter of fundraising should be denied, as such a broadly conceived collection, intended to encompass all eastern voivodeships, could easily be given a propagandistic-agitational character and utilized (...) in a direction hostile to the Polish statehood, presenting the fundraising act as allegedly caused by the dire financial situation of the Orthodox Church in Poland.

Ultimately, Hegumeness Nina obtained permission for the nuns to move to the buildings of the former parish school near another Orthodox church in Vilnius (St. Alexander Nevsky), located in the Naujininkai district. On 1 May 1937, the Synod of Bishops of the Polish Orthodox Church merged the two female monastic communities according to previous plans, and Metropolitan Dionizy obtained permission to build a larger residential facility for the 32 nuns of the monastery and to conduct fundraising for this purpose. Up to that time, the nuns' only means of support were the manual labor they performed and the voluntary contributions of the faithful. With the financial assistance of the faithful, the nuns carried out a general renovation of the church, adapted the former school buildings for their purposes, and established an orchard and garden around the buildings. At the time of the merger of the monasteries, the Synod of the Polish Orthodox Church considered naming the new community after the Holy Trinity; however, it was ultimately decided to adopt Mary Magdalene as its patron saint.

The significance of the monastery for female monasticism in the Polish Orthodox Church is evidenced by the fact that two nuns from the Vilnius community were appointed hegumenesses and placed in charge of other female monasteries. This occurred in 1931; the nuns from the Monastery of St. Mary Magdalene were appointed as superiors of the monasteries in Zymne and Korets. In 1939, Metropolitan Dionizy of Warsaw, as a testament to the importance of the Monastery of St. Mary Magdalene for Orthodoxy in the Lithuanian lands, donated to the nuns' church icons of St. Job of Pochayev and St. Mary Magdalene with their relics, as well as a copy of the Theotokos of Pochayiv. Throughout the entire period of World War II, the monastery remained active.

=== In the USSR ===
==== World War II and the 1940s ====
On 10 July 1944, the Church of St. Alexander Nevsky suffered serious damage due to an air raid. The main dome and bell tower were destroyed, and residential buildings were damaged. The original interior furnishings also suffered almost complete destruction, with the iconostasis burning down. As a result, in the early years after the war, the function of the church was fulfilled by a makeshift home chapel set up in the right wing of the building complex. In 1947, the nuns completed the reconstruction of the residential quarters and bell tower. Two years later, the main dome was rebuilt. Simultaneously, work was underway to reconstruct the interior of the church, mainly delayed due to a lack of funds to purchase materials. On 8 November 1951, Archbishop Focjusz Topiro of the Russian Orthodox Diocese of Lithuania re-consecrated the building. At that time, the nuns had the Church of St. Alexander Nevsky and the home chapel of St. Mary Magdalene. Four years later, with financial assistance from the Moscow Patriarchate, the monastery facilities were expanded: in addition to a two-story house for the nuns, a laundry room was built, the guardhouse was renovated, the complex of buildings was surrounded by a brick wall, and water and electricity were supplied. The monastery housed 35 nuns. In 1947, one of them, Tabita Dmitruk, was transferred to the Monastery of the Holy Trinity and St. Sergius of Radonezh in Riga as the hegumeness.

==== Closing of the Church of St. Alexander Nevsky ====
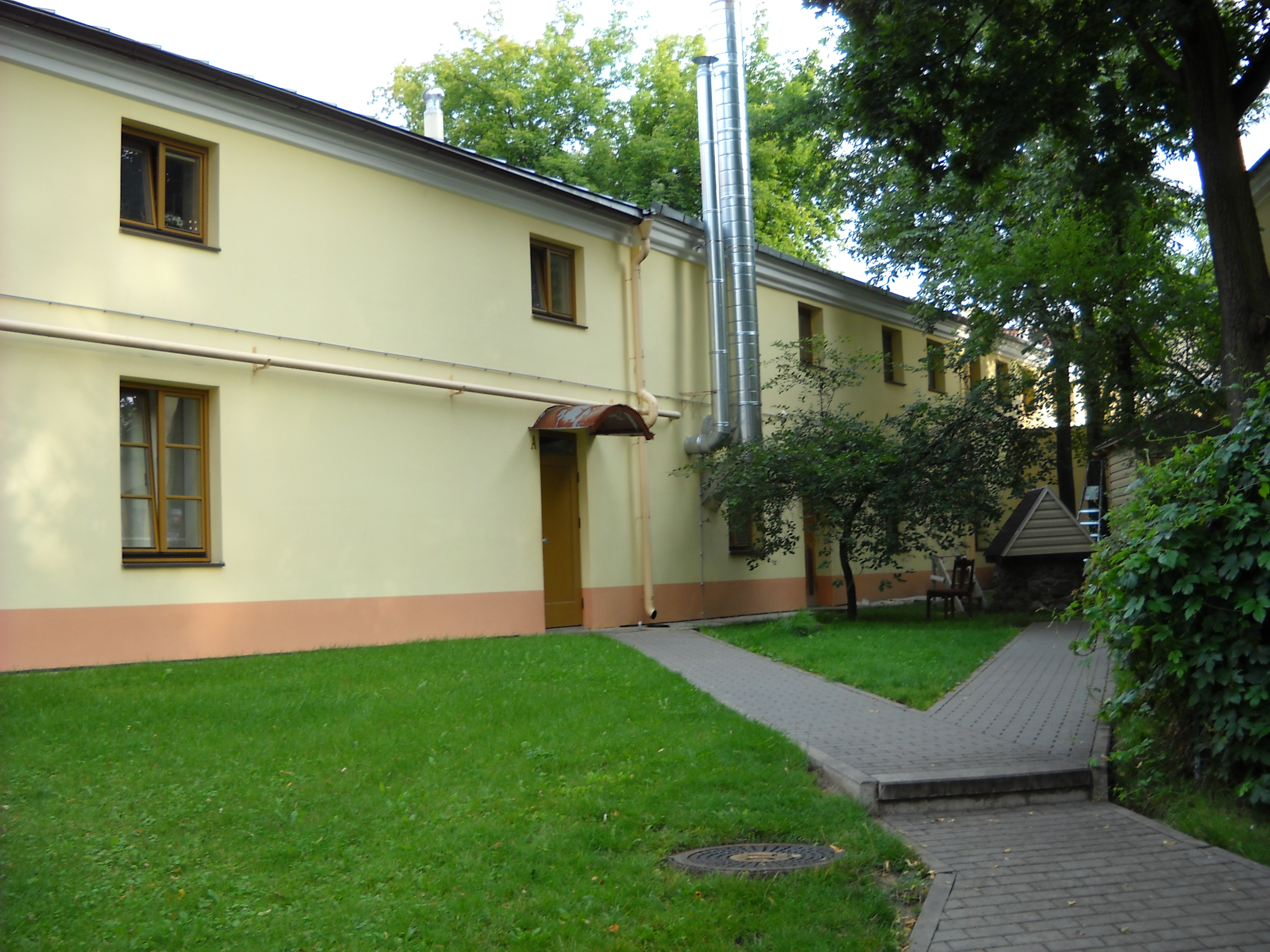
The buildings of the Monastery of the Holy Spirit in Vilnius, used by the nuns of St. Mary Magdalene Monastery in 1960–2015

In 1957, the monastery housed 17 nuns, 12 rasophore sisters and novices. Further expansion of the church and monastery was planned, but on 12 June 1959, despite parishioner protests, both the monastery and the church were removed from the register of active Orthodox religious sites. This was equivalent to the confiscation of monastery property. Parishioners sent a letter to Nikita Khrushchev, requesting consideration of the church's importance to the southern districts of Vilnius, but to no avail. On 28 August 1960, the last nuns left the monastery premises. At that time, there were 23 nuns and 5 novices living in the monastery. They relocated to the buildings of the male Monastery of the Holy Spirit, where they remained until 2015. They retained most of the monastery's movable property, except for individual items transferred to the Cathedral of the Theotokos in Vilnius. A few nuns settled in the Pühtitsa Convent.

==== In the Monastery of the Holy Spirit ====
The life of both monasteries was largely integrated: the nuns worked for both communities in the kitchen, garden, office, baked prosphora, took care of the Orthodox cemetery in Vilnius, and sang in the choir of the Church of the Holy Spirit in Vilnius. The nuns occupied one of the wings of the monastery complex. In 1965, the 100th anniversary of the monastery's existence was solemnly celebrated. In 1989, the Council of Ministers of Lithuania declared the nullity of the decree abolishing the monastery, which gave it a legal basis for independent functioning also de jure.

The Mother Superior of the Monastery of St. Mary Magdalene remained until 1968 Hegumeness Nina (Bataszowa), who then took the vows of the Great Schema with the name Barbara, thereby stepping down from her position (she died in 1969). She was replaced by her niece, Sister Angelina (Bataszowa). In the same year, Sister Barbara Trofimowa left the community, and as an hegumeness, she took the lead of the Pühtitsa Convent.

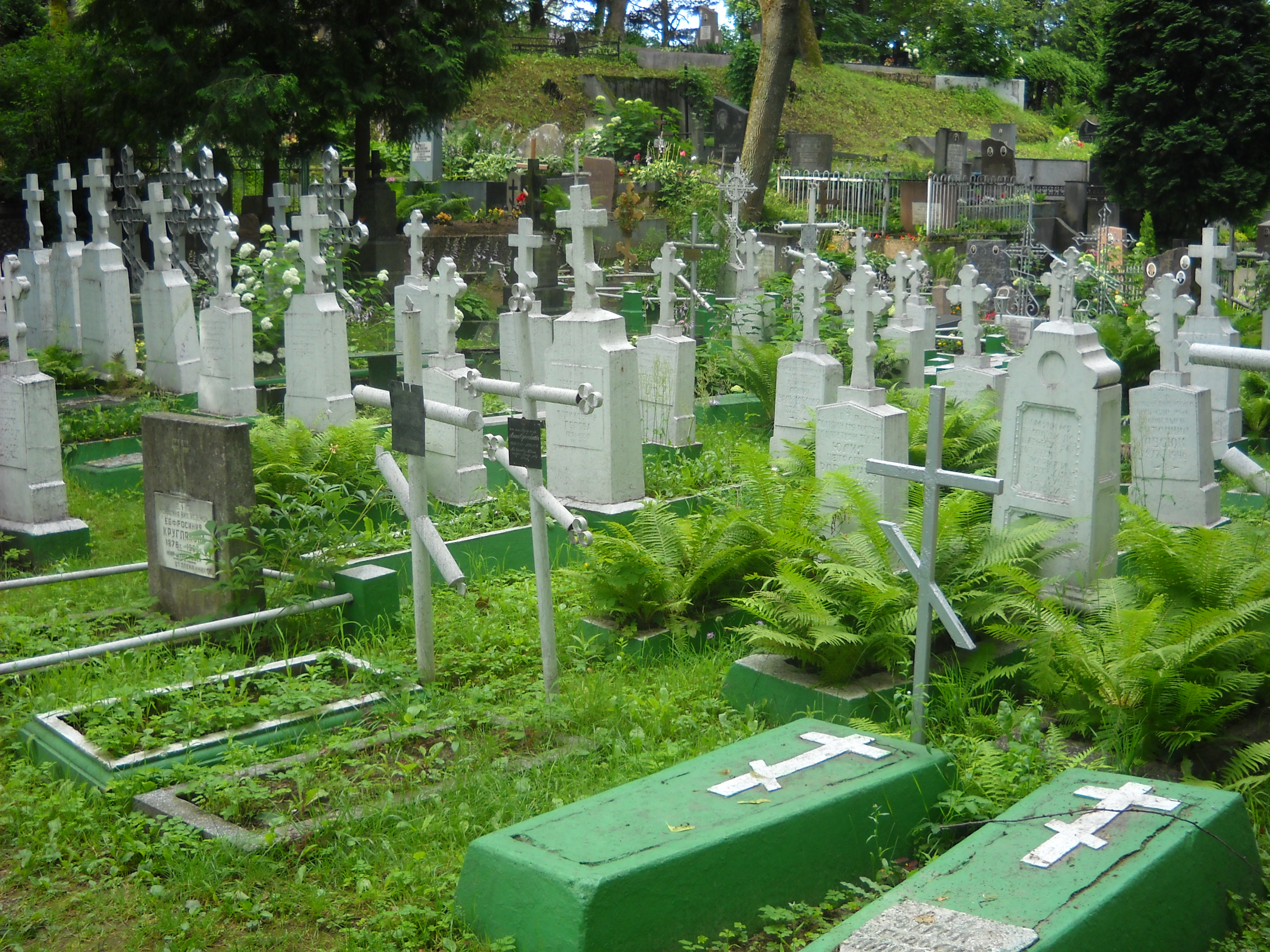
Graves of monastery nuns in Vilnius Orthodox cemetery

=== In independent Lithuania ===
==== In the Monastery of the Holy Spirit ====
In 2002, Sister Nadzieja (Łomako) became the new Mother Superior. Two years later, the monastery was home to 9 nuns and 4 novices. The website of the Russian Orthodox Diocese of Lithuania stated that in 2010, the community consisted of 12 nuns. This is the only Orthodox female monastery in Lithuania. In 2011, the Mother Superior of the community was Sister Archełaja (Iwanowa).

==== Return to the facilities at the Church of St. Alexander Nevsky ====
On 24 May 2015, the nuns returned to the buildings used by the community from 1937 to 1960, located near the Church of St. Alexander Nevsky. On the same day, the Mother Superior of the monastery, Sister Serafina (Iwanowa), was elevated to the rank of hegumeness. In 2016, the community consisted of 9 nuns and 1 novice.

Two former Mother Superiors of the monastery, Igumenia Flawiana and Antonina, were buried near the monastery buildings used until 1915. Other burials of the sisters were and continue to be carried out at the Orthodox cemetery in Vilnius, in a designated section.

==== Branch church in Posakiszki ====
In 2022, the construction of the branch church dedicated to the Icon of the Mother of God "Joy and Consolation" in Posakiszki (Bezdonys Eldership, Vilnius District Municipality) was completed. On February 3 of that year, the facility was consecrated by Metropolitan Innocent of Vilnius and Lithuania.

== Bibliography ==
- Dobrianski, F. "Старая и новая Вильна. Храмы православные. Женский монастырь". Archived from the original on 2009-04-27.
- Pawluczuk, U. A. (2007). Życie monastyczne w II Rzeczypospolitej. Białystok: Wydawnictwo Uniwersytetu w Białymstoku. ISBN 978-83-7431-127-4.
- Rudin, Leonid G.; Kuznecov, Pavel V., eds. (2011). Monastyri Russkoj Pravoslavnoj Cerkvi: spravočnik-putevoditel'. Vyp. 2 (in Russian). Moskva: Obščestvo sochranenija literaturnogo nasledija (OSLN). ISBN 978-5-902484-31-8.
- Szlewis, G. (2010). "ВИЛЬНЮССКИЙ ВО ИМЯ РАВНОАПОСТОЛЬНОЙ МАРИИ МАГДАЛИНЫ ЖЕНСКИЙ МОНАСТЫРЬ". pravenc.ru (in Russian).
- Szlewis, G. (2006). Православные храмы Литвы. Vilnius: Свято-Духов Монастыр. ISBN 9986-559-62-6.
- Trofimowa, Barbara (1965). "К 100-летию Православного Виленского Марие-Магдалинского женского монастыря (летопись)". orthodoxy.lt. Archived from the original on 2007-10-29.
