= Church of St. Alexander Nevsky, Vilnius =

Church building in Vilnius, Lithuania

Coordinates: 54°39′57″N 25°17′13″E

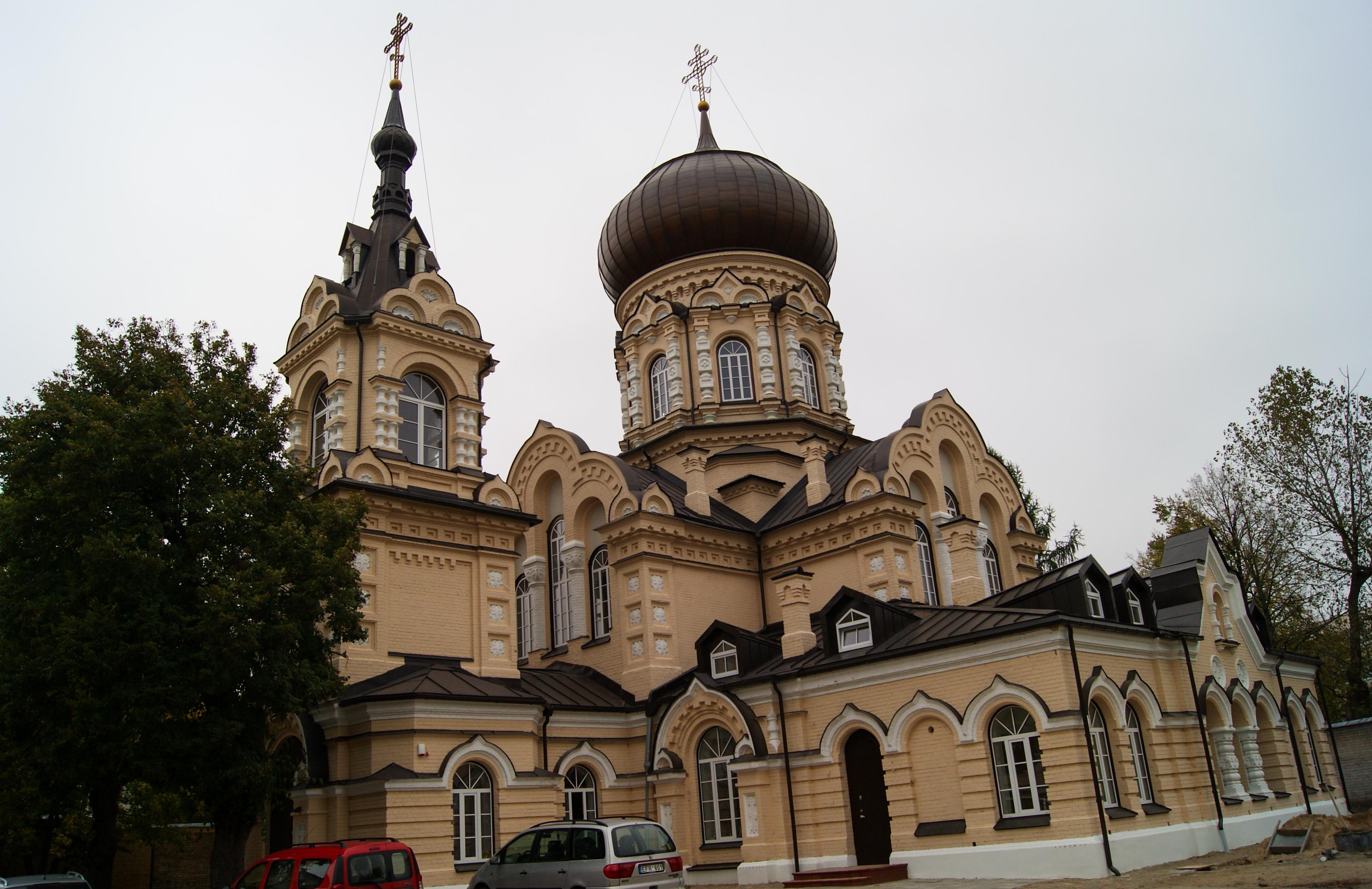
Church of St. Alexander Nevsky

Saint Alexander Nevsky Church (Lithuanian: Šv. Aleksandro Neviškio cerkvė; Russian: Церковь Святого Александра Невского) is an Eastern Orthodox church in the Naujininkai district of Vilnius dedicated to patron saint Alexander Nevsky. It was built in 1898 and closed by the Soviet government in 1959. After the dissolution of the Soviet Union in 1991, it was given back to the Russian Orthodox Church, but due to the destruction of the interior of the building during the period of closure, it was not reopened as a church until 2012. It belongs to the Russian Orthodox Diocese of Lithuania.

== History ==
In 1895, the Orthodox Brotherhood of the Holy Spirit appealed to the local government to build a new Orthodox parish church in the southern districts of Vilnius. Next year, the architect M. Prozorov prepared its project, which included a Neo-Byzantine brick church and a parish school with separate classrooms for boys and girls. The building was ready in October 1898 and was consecrated in the same month by Orthodox Archbishop of Vilnius and all of Lithuania, Yuvenalis (Polovstsev).

The church remained active during the First World War, when most of the Orthodox churches in Vilnius were closed. The school, however, was closed in 1915. In 1937 its buildings were rebuilt in order to house an Orthodox female monastery of Saint Mary Magdalene. The nuns, supported by the local congregation, organised a general renovation of the church and also built a garden next to it. In 1944, during the bombing of Vilnius, the church was almost entirely destroyed. However, the nuns managed to rebuild the church once again and in 1951 it was reconsecrated.

In June 1959, the Soviet government announced that both the monastery and Saint Alexander Nevsky church were to be closed. The parishioners addressed a letter to Nikita Khrushchev, asking him not to liquidate the only Orthodox church in the southern part of the city but the request was rejected. The last nuns moved out of the monastery in August 1960 and the empty church was turned into a warehouse.

In 1990, Saint Alexander Nevsky church was given back to the Vilnius diocese of the Russian Orthodox Church and registered as a parish church. However, due to the lack of funds for renovation and the complete destruction of the interior of the church, no service has been held there.

Before 2012, the renovation works were finally achieved and the church was reopened on its patron day, in December 2012. Now, it is again a parish church.
