= Exarchate of Lithuania =

Constantinople-aligned Eastern Orthodox Church jurisdiction in Lithuania

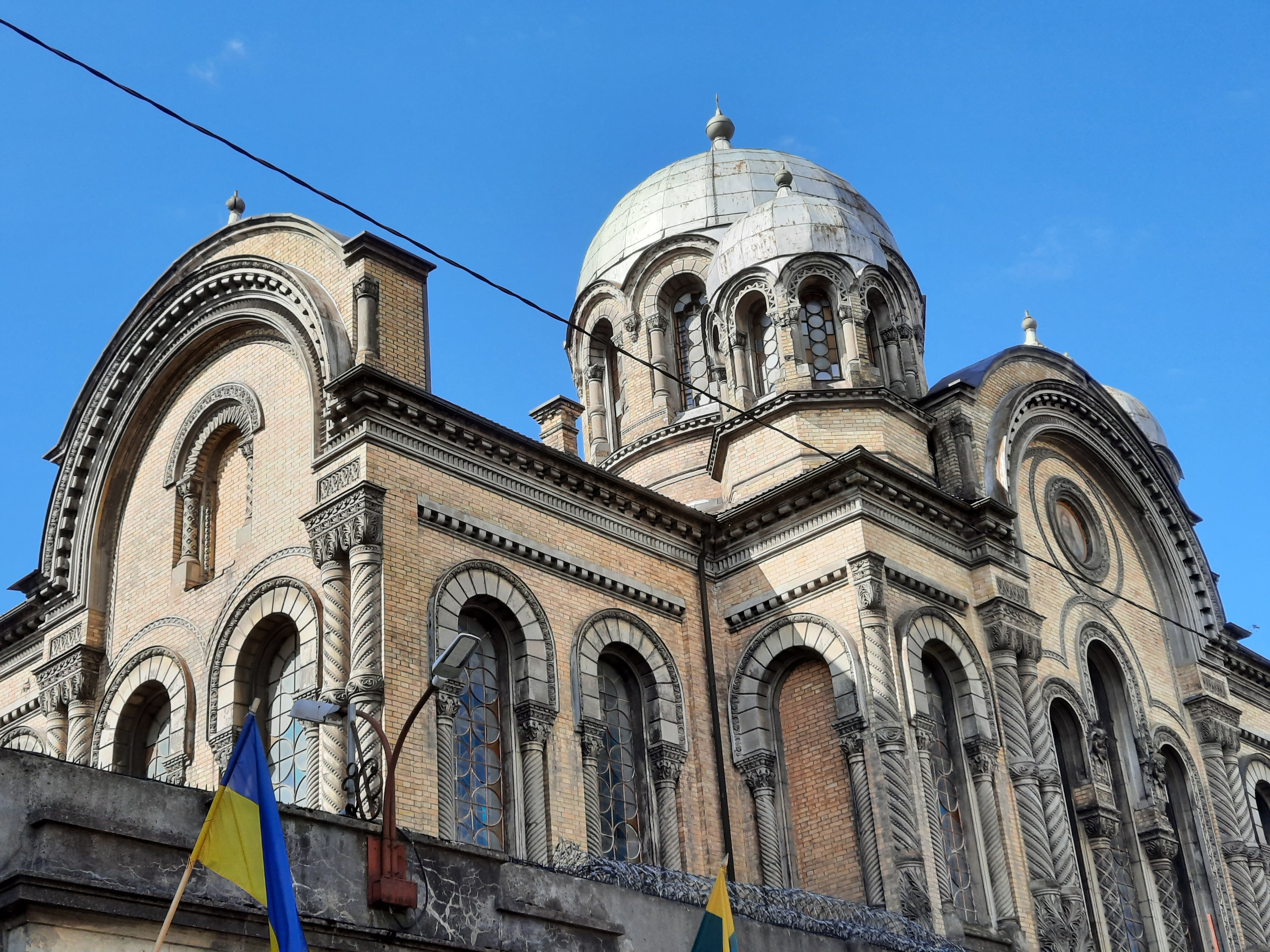
Saint Nicholas' Church in Vilnius (2023), primary church of the Exarchate of Lithuania

The Exarchate of Lithuania, (Note: Lithuanian: Lietuvos egzarchatas, Greek: Εξαρχία της Λιθουανίας, romanized: Exarchía tis Lithouanías) formally the Exarchate of the Ecumenical Patriarchate in Lithuania, (Note: Lithuanian: Visuotinio patriarchato Egzarchatas Lietuvoje, Greek: Πατριαρχική Εξαρχία Λιθουανίας, romanized: Patriarchikí Exarchía Lithouanías) is an Orthodox ecclesiastical territorial unit under the jurisdiction of the Ecumenical Patriarchate of Constantinople, covering the territory of the Republic of Lithuania. It was established in the early 2023, following a schism within the Russian Orthodox Diocese of Lithuania, which maintained its canonical ties to the Moscow Patriarchate in face of the full-scale Russian invasion of Ukraine since February 2022. The current Exarch of Lithuania is Panaretos of Tamisos.

== History ==
After the full-scale Russian invasion of Ukraine began on 24 February 2022, Patriarch Kirill of Moscow publicly declared his full support of the Russian military aggression, calling it a holy war. The Orthodox clergy and laity in Lithuania responded negatively, and were initially united in their support for Ukraine. In a letter to the Orthodox Christian community on 17 March 2022, Metropolitan Innocent (Vasilyev) of Vilnius stated: "As you probably have already noticed, Patriarch Kirill and I have different political views and perception of current events. His political statements on the war in Ukraine are his personal opinion. We in Lithuania do not agree with it. I would like to openly state here that we, the Orthodox in Lithuania, having the opportunity to independently solve our intra-church affairs, will continue to strive for even greater church independence, believing that the Lord grants such in His own time." He appealed to Moscow to grant the Archdiocese of Vilnius and Lithuania the status of a self-governing church.

Current status of the 2018 schism by Orthodox Church jurisdiction. Recognises OCU autocephaly Concelebrated with or commemorated OCU primate in Divine Liturgy diptych No definitive statements yet on OCU Does NOT recognise OCU autocephaly Territorial disputes between Moscow Patriarchate (MP) and Ecumenical Patriarchate of Constantinople or Romanian Orthodox Church. This includes the ongoing disputes over the Russian Orthodox Diocese of Lithuania versus the Ecumenical Exarchate of Lithuania.

In April 2022, two priests contacted the Archdiocese, saying they could no longer commemorate Patriach Kirill's name during the divine liturgy, as that went against their conscience. In May 2022, Metropolitan Innocent suspended them and three other priests "for breaking their oath". Meanwhile, Mayor Remigijus Šimašius of Vilnius publicly supported the dissidents and proposed to return jurisdiction over the Lithuanian Orthodox Church from Moscow back to Constantinople, as it was before 1686, when the annexation of the Metropolis of Kyiv by the Moscow Patriarchate began. In May 2022, Prime Minister Ingrida Šimonytė of Lithuania wrote a letter directly to Ecumenical Patriach Bartholomew of Constantinople in support of the five suspended priests, saying "They have the right to practice their faith without a conflict of conscience." In June 2022, the Church Court dismissed the five dissident priests from the priesthood. Patriach Kirill defrocked the five priests from the diocese of Vilnius and Lithuania for engaging in numerous violations, including but not limited to organizing with another church's jurisdiction.

The five priests turned to the Ecumenical Patriarch Bartholomew I of Constantinople, asking to either be reinstated, or to switch jurisdiction from the Moscow Patriachate to the Ecumenical Patriachate of Constantinople. In August 2022, the five dissident priests and their supporters established the Centre for Initiatives of Orthodox Christians (KOIC), a non-governmental organisation to oppose Patriarch Kirill. It stated: "KOIC unites Orthodox believers, who do not accept the politicization of the Moscow Patriarchate. The community includes local believers of various nationalities, Ukrainian refugees, Belarusian and Russian dissidents." On 6 November 2022, a dissident Orthodox community service organised by KOIC was held in Vilnius, with the participation of like-minded believers from Klaipeda, opposing the Moscow Patriarchate and reiterating the request to transfer jurisdiction to the Ecumenical Patriarchate.

On 17 February 2023, the Ecumenical Patriach reinstated the five dissidents in their priestly ministry, granting them permission to resume leading the liturgy on 3 March. Phanar had ruled that the priests were removed for their stance on Russia's invasion of Ukraine rather than for violating church rules. In response, Metropolitan Innocent announced he would not accept the priests' restoration; he did, however, allow the parish of St Paraskevi in Vilnius "to celebrate a mass for refugees from Ukraine, without mentioning the name of the Moscow Patriarch Kirill." In March 2023, Patriarch Bartholomew paid an official visit to Lithuania, signing a cooperation agreement with the Prime Minister of Lithuania Ingrida Šimonytė on closer relations and cooperation and announced his intention to form a church structure under the Ecumenical Patriarchate. The Patriarch also met with the five restored priests and provided for the creation of the ecclesiastical jurisdiction of the Ecumenical Patriarchate in the country. The Holy Synod of the Ecumenical Patriarchate established the Exarchate of the Ecumenical Patriarchate in Lithuania on 1 May 2023.

In January 2024, Justinus Kiviloo, a priest of the Estonian Apostolic Orthodox Church, was appointed as the Exarch of Lithuania. Kiviloo commented: "I've heard that there is an opinion in Lithuania that Russian [Orthodox] churches should be taken away [from the Moscow Patriarchate]. I'm categorically against that. We have to build churches ourselves." On 7 February 2024, the Ministry of Justice of Lithuania granted official recognition to the Exarchate of the Ecumenical Patriarchate in Lithuania as an independent organisation in the Register of Legal Entities. Archpriest Vitalijus Mockus estimated that about 15 to 20% of the clergy and laity of the Russian Archdiocese had left to join the Constantinople-aligned Exarchate. As of May 2024, the Exarchate of Lithuania included 10 parishes (communities) and 10 priests, serving the liturgy in the Lithuanian, Belarusian, Ukrainian and Russian languages. The Russian Archdiocese of Vilnius and Lithuania still had 5 deaneries, 50 parishes, 62 clergy, 1 male and 1 female monastery.

In January 2026, Russia's Foreign Intelligence Service and Ministry of Foreign Affairs issued a joint statement, claiming that Ecumenical Patriach Bartholomew I of Constantinople was an "antichrist" or "incarnate devil", working to drive Russian Orthodoxy out of Lithuania, Latvia, and Estonia, through acts such as establishing a separate Exarchate of Lithuania. Both the Constantinople-aligned Exarchate priest Gintaras Sungaila and Moscow-aligned Metropolitan Innocent condemned the insults, with the latter adding: "Peace between confessions is also important to us, and we oppose religious wars in any form."

== Ortodoksų versus stačiatikių ==
In contrast to the Russian Orthodox Diocese of Lithuania, which began calling itself "Lithuanian Orthodox Church" (Lietuvos Stačiatikių Bažnyčia) and "Orthodox Church in Lithuania" (Stačiatikių Bažnyčia Lietuvoje) in 2023, the clergy and laity of the Exarchate of Lithuania prefer the term Ortodoksų over Stačiatikių. The General Statutes of Parishes adopted on 24 September 2024 write "ortodoksų (stačiatikių)" four times, while the Centre for Initiatives of Orthodox Christians (Krikščionių ortodoksų iniciatyvų centras, KOIC) also uses ortodoksų, and ortodoksas.lt as domain name.

An essay on the official Exarchate website titled "Five false stereotypes about the Ortodoksų (Stačiatikių) Church" argues that in the 20th century, the practice emerged to call the Orthodox Church in Lithuania pravoslavų (from Russian pravoslavie) or stačiatikių (meaning "praying upright", an attempt to literally translate orthodoxa from Greek to Lithuanian). Both terms have had their share of critics: the first because it is a Russian loan word, the second because it was linguistically contestable whether stačiatikių was a proper translation of orthodoxa. It was not until 2005 when Lithuanian-speaking Orthodox Christians began regularly practicing prayer in the Lithuanian language (instead of Church Slavonic), and decided to call themselves ortodoksais, simply adapting the Greek word to the Lithuanian vocabulary and grammar. Thus, within the Exarchate of Lithuania, sometimes "(stačiatikių)" is still mentioned in brackets after ortodoksų, but at other times, it is already calling itself and the wider Orthodox Church Ortodoksų Bažnyčia.

== See also ==
- Christianity in Lithuania
- Metropolis of Lithuania
