= Panaretos of Tamisos =

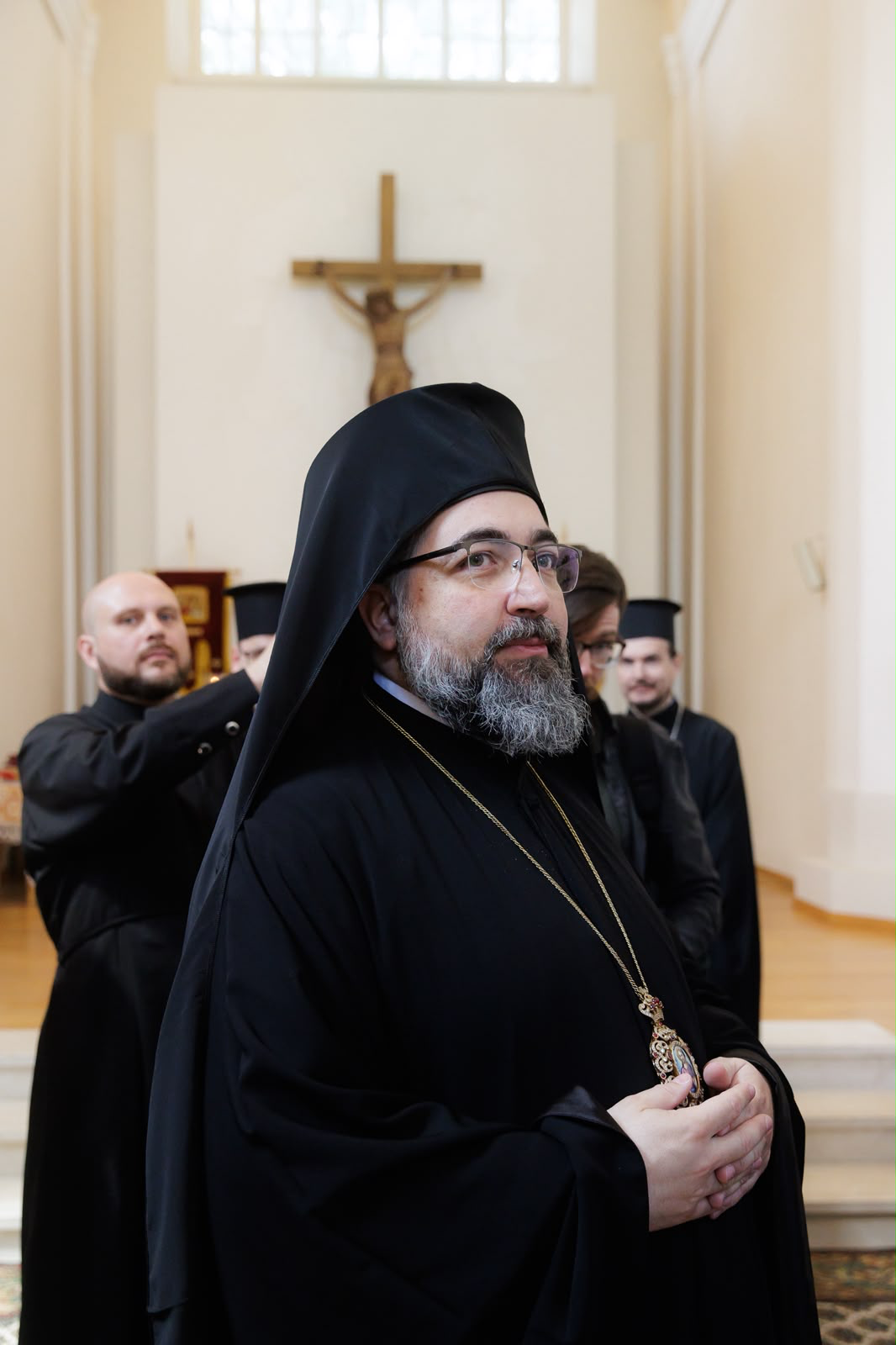
Bishop Panaretos of Tamisos

Panaretos of Tamisos (secular name: Matthaios Psaraftis) is a hierarch of the Ecumenical Patriarchate of Constantinople, serving as the Exarch of Lithuania and bishop of Tamisos since 2026.

== Biography ==
He studied at the St. Matthew of Crete Ecclesiastical Lyceum and subsequently at the Higher Ecclesiastical School of Thessaloniki. He later continued his theological studies at the School of Theology at the University of Athens.

On 2 November 2002, at the Monastery of St. George Epanosifis in Crete, he was tonsured a monk by Protosyncellus Cyril (Koyerakis) of the Archdiocese of Crete. In February 2003, he was ordained a hierodeacon. On 12 December 2003, he was ordained a hieromonk by Bishop Makarios (Douloufakis) of Knossos. In 2010 he was elevated to the rank of archimandrite.

In 2013, at the invitation of the Ecumenical Patriarch of Constantinople he went to Istanbul to minister to Russian-speaking believers of the Church of Saint Andrew the Apostle in Karaköy.

In 2014, he was appointed Grand Hierokeryx (preacher). On 26 May 2026, by a decision of the Holy Synod of the Ecumenical Patriarchate of Constantinople he was elected to be ordained as Bishop of Tamisos and Exarch of Lithuania.

On 31 May 2026, his episcopal consecration took place at the Patriarchal Cathedral of St. George in Phanar. On 7 June 2026, during his visit to Lithuania, Patriarch Bartholomew I of Constantinople presided over the enthronement of the new Exarch of Lithuania.
