= Church of the Sacred Heart of Jesus, Vilnius =

Roman Catholic church in Vilnius, Lithuania built in 1694–1756

Church of the Sacred Heart of Jesus Švč. Jėzaus Širdies bažnyčia
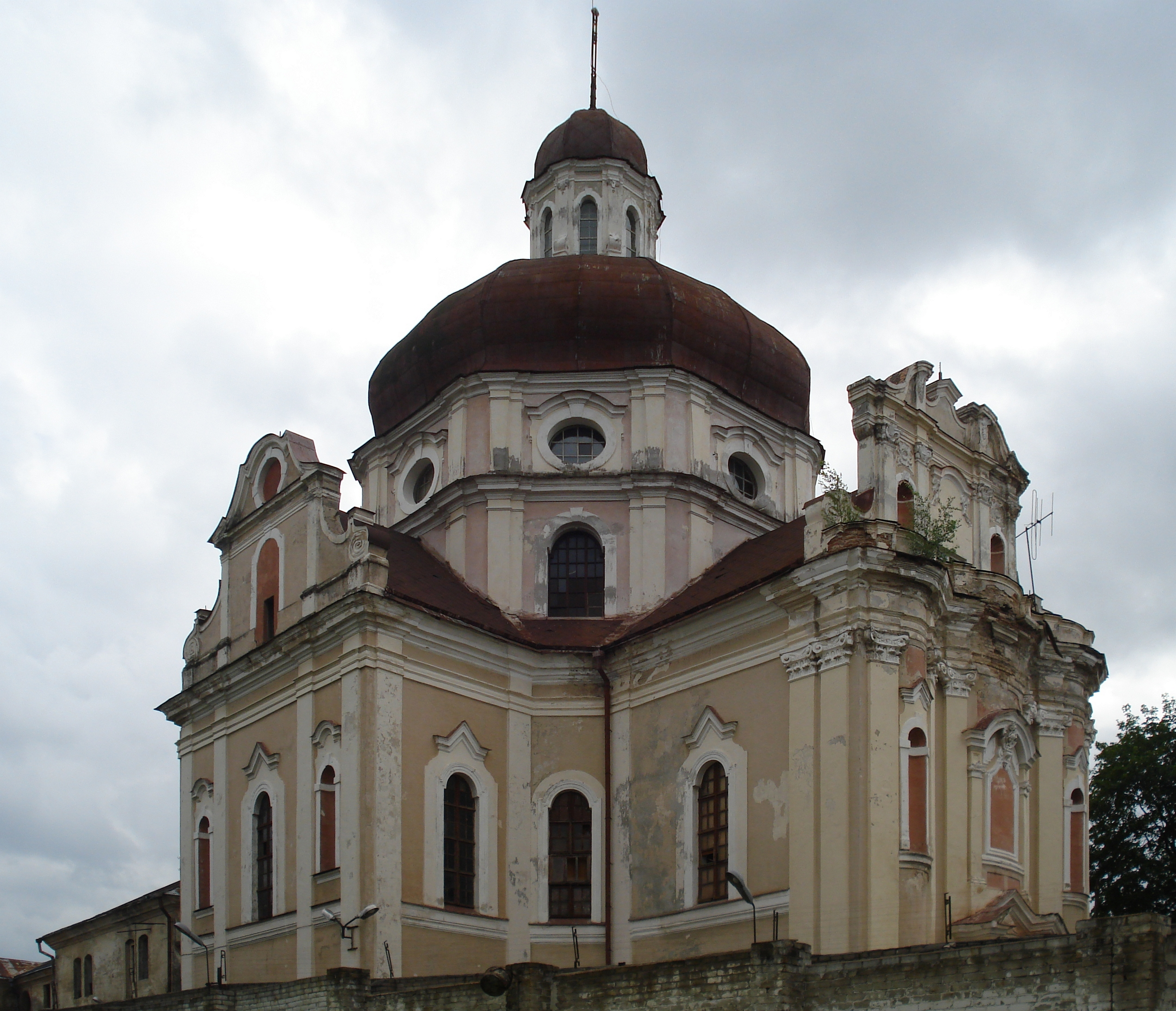
- Façade of the church in 2007

Religion
- Affiliation: Roman Catholic
- Diocese: Vilnius Old Town
- Leadership: Roman Catholic Archdiocese of Vilnius
- Year consecrated: 1756

Location
- Location: Vilnius, Lithuania
- Interactive map of Church of the Sacred Heart of Jesus; Švč. Jėzaus Širdies bažnyčia
- Coordinates: 54°40′32.84″N 25°17′50.5″E

Architecture
- Architects: Carlo Antonio Bai, Guido Antonio Longhi, Johann Christoph Glaubitz
- Type: Church
- Style: Baroque
- Completed: 1756
- Materials: Plastered masonry

Church of the Sacred Heart of Jesus (Lithuanian: Švč. Jėzaus Širdies bažnyčia) is a Roman Catholic church in the Vilnius Old Town, which was built in 1694–1756 and consecrated in 1756.

Initially, it was part of the Order of the Visitation of Holy Mary's monastery complex. Later it was part of the Vilnius Correctional Institution complex. However, in 2007 the church and monastery were returned to the Lithuanian Catholic Church and in 2012 nuns established a hospice.

== Gallery ==
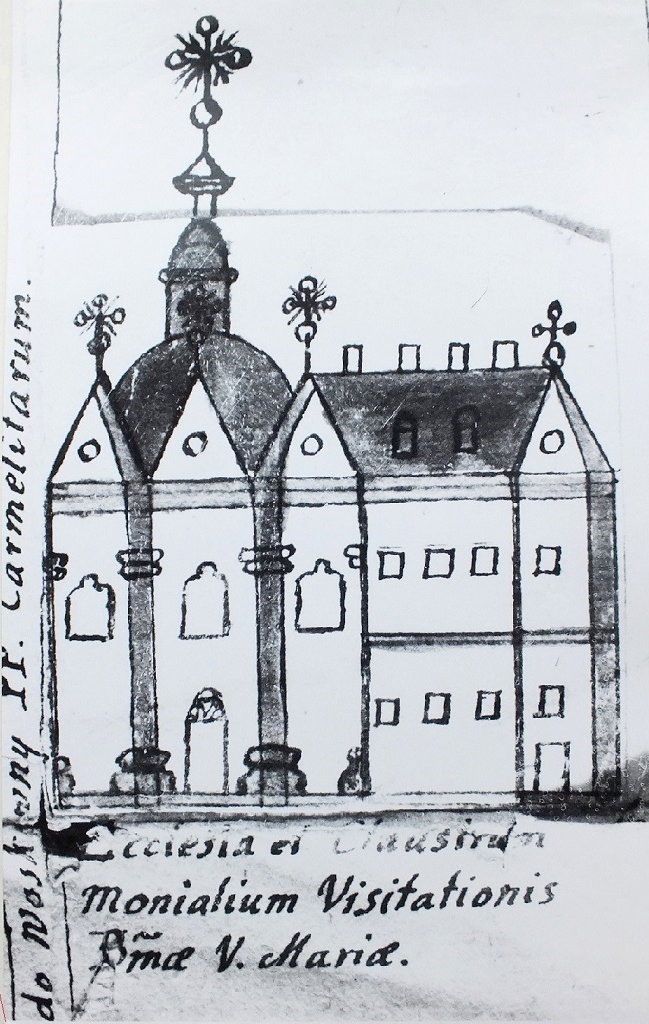
Painting of the church in the 18th century

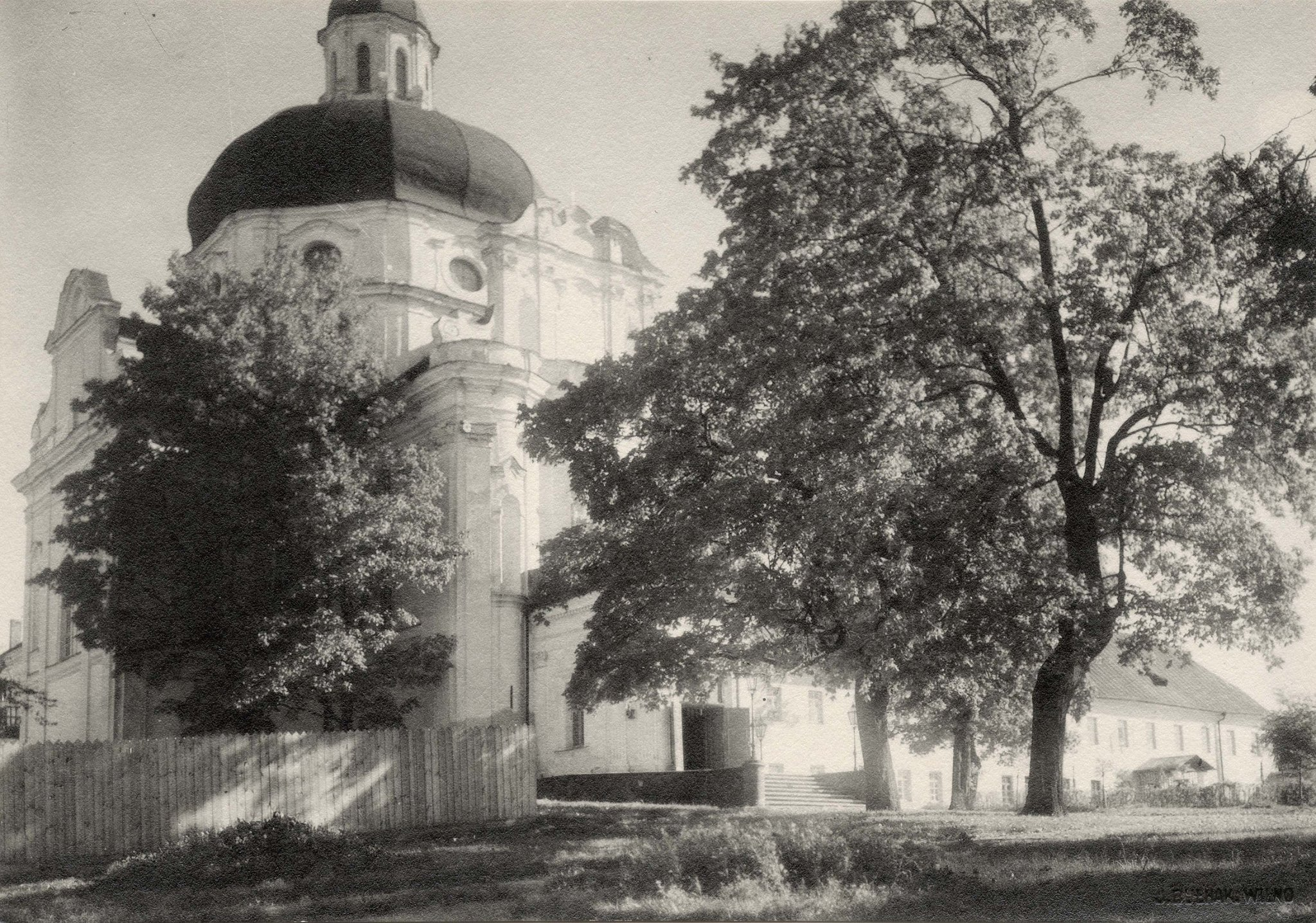
View of the church in 1912–1915

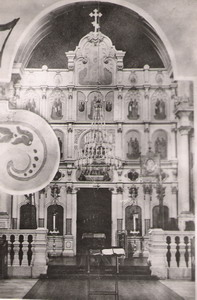
Interior of the church (before 1915)

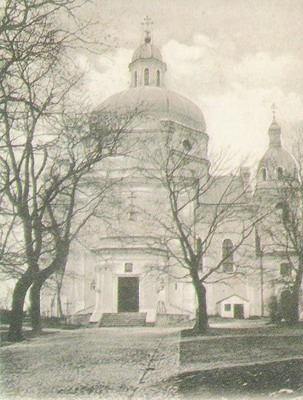
View of the church (before 1915)

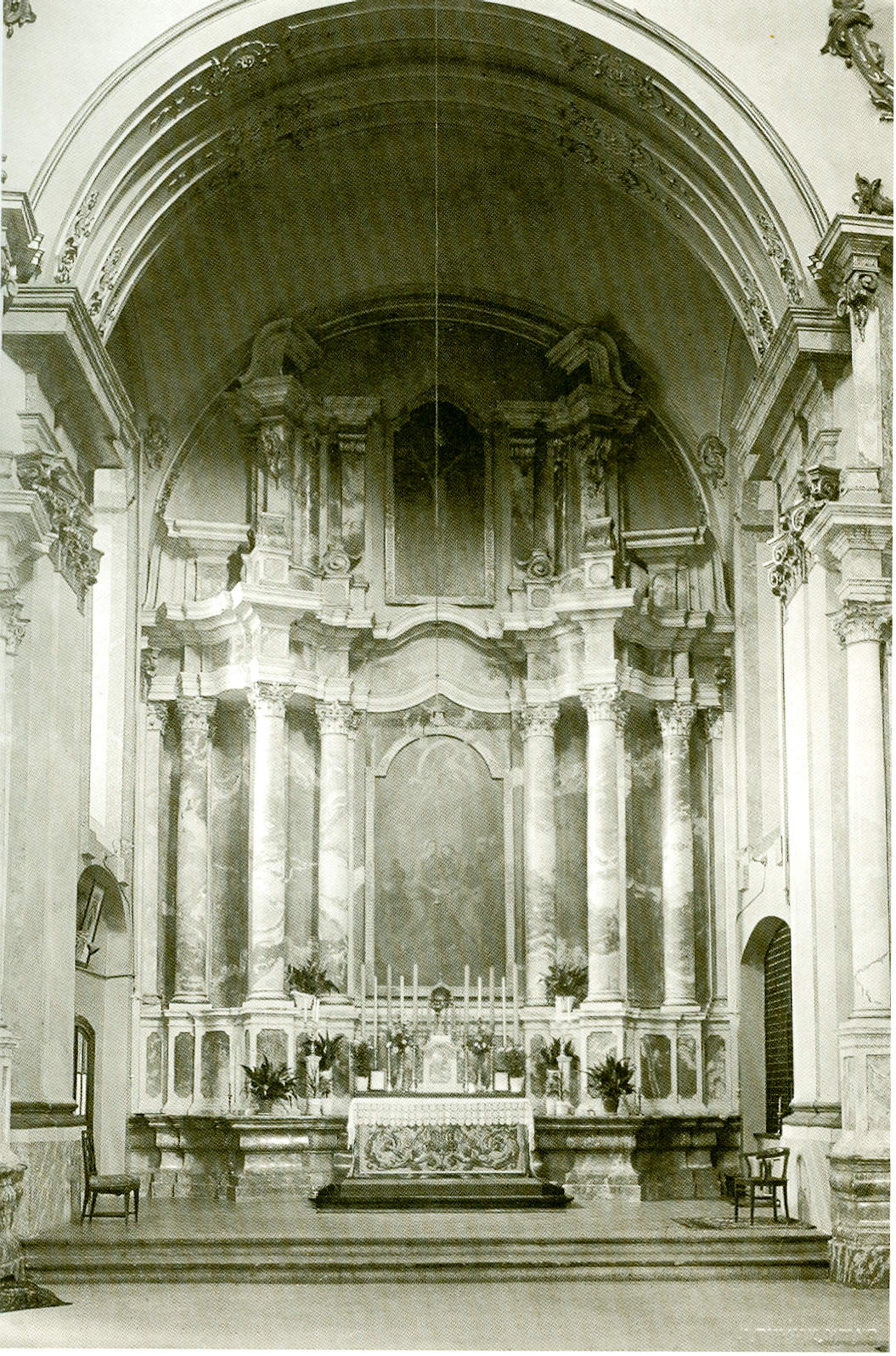
Interior of the church in 1916

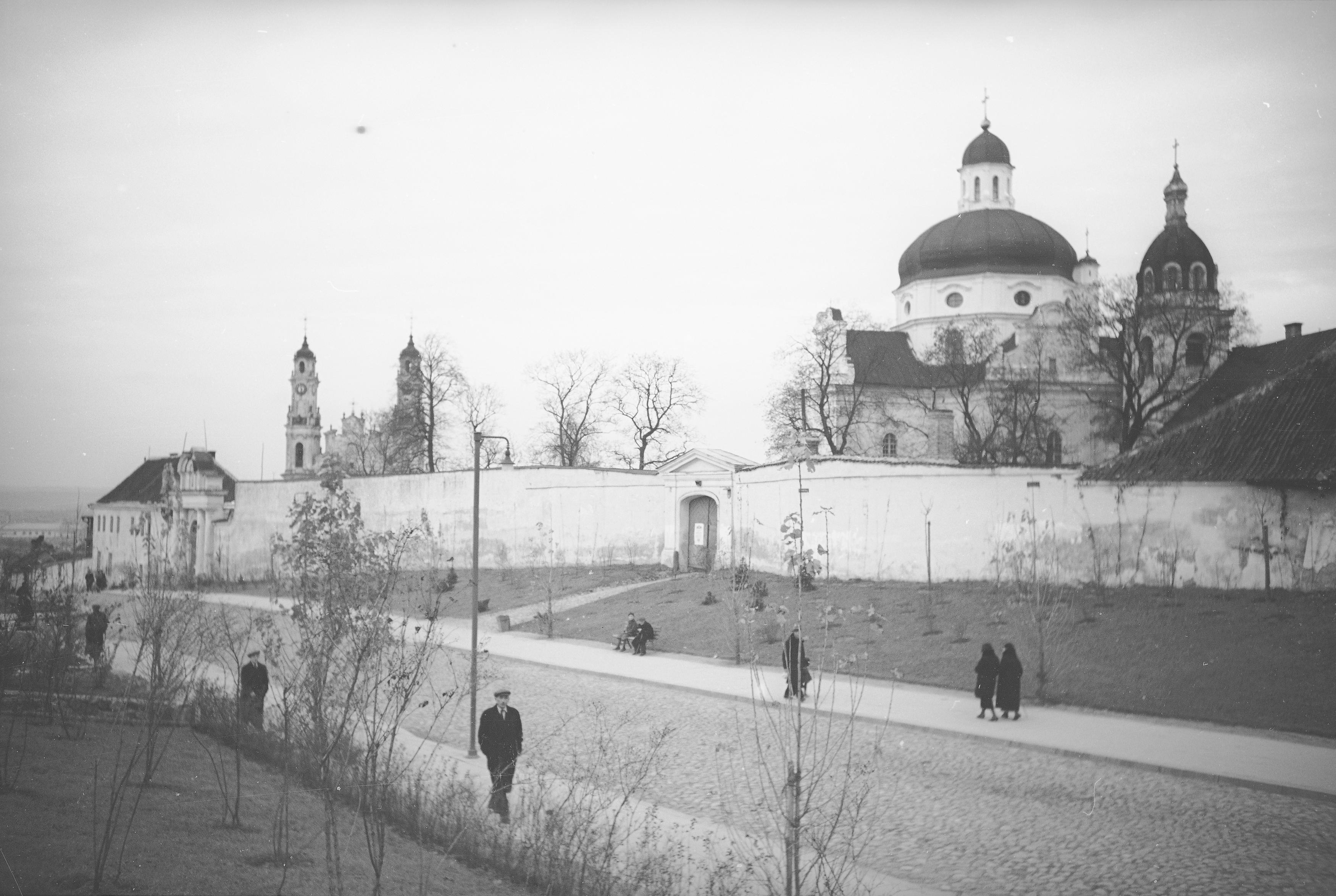
Gates to the monastery in 1937

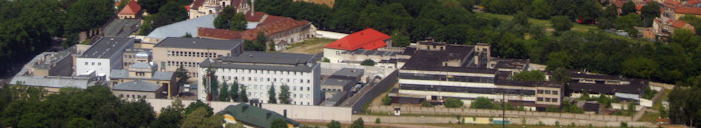
Aerial photo of the Vilnius Correctional Institution in 2008

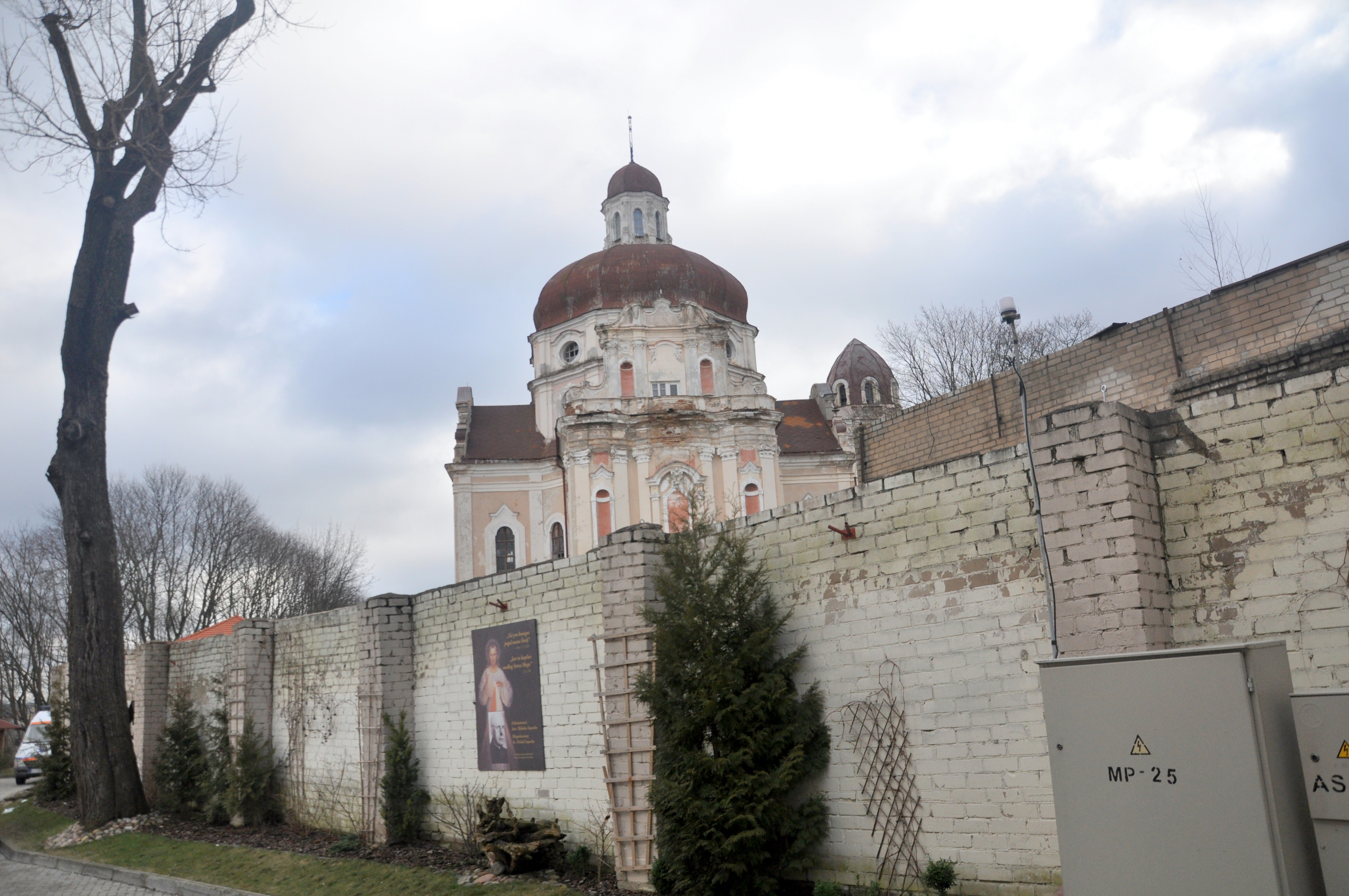
Side-view of the church in 2014
