= Naujininkai =

- Eldership
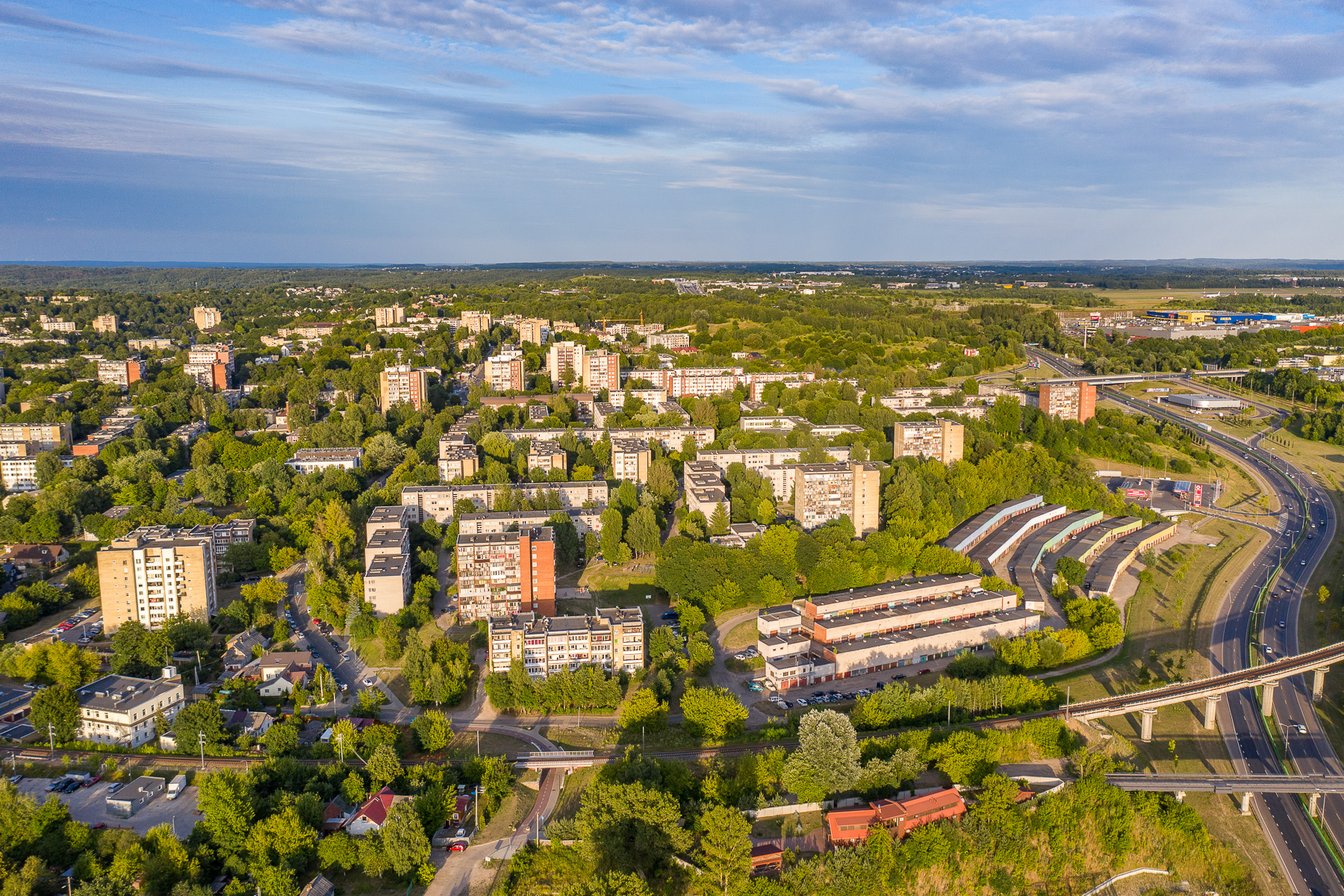

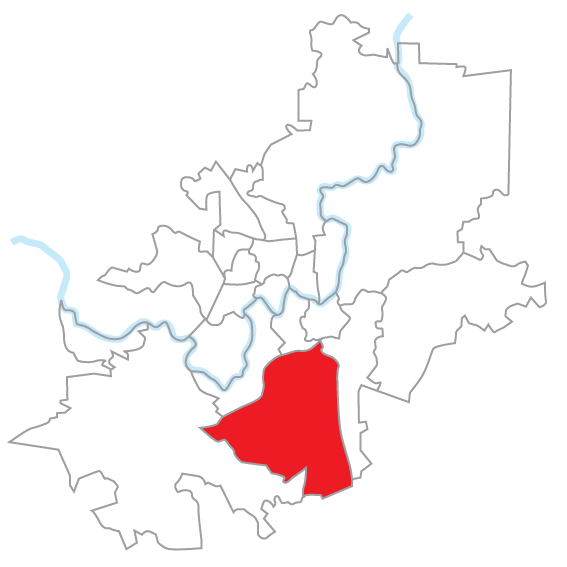

- Location of Naujininkai
- Country: Lithuania
- County: Vilnius County
- Municipality: Vilnius city municipality

Area
  - Total: 41 km^{2} (16 sq mi)

Population (2021)
  - Total: 30,030
  - Density: 730/km^{2} (1,900/sq mi)
- Time zone: UTC+2 (EET)
  - Summer (DST): UTC+3 (EEST)

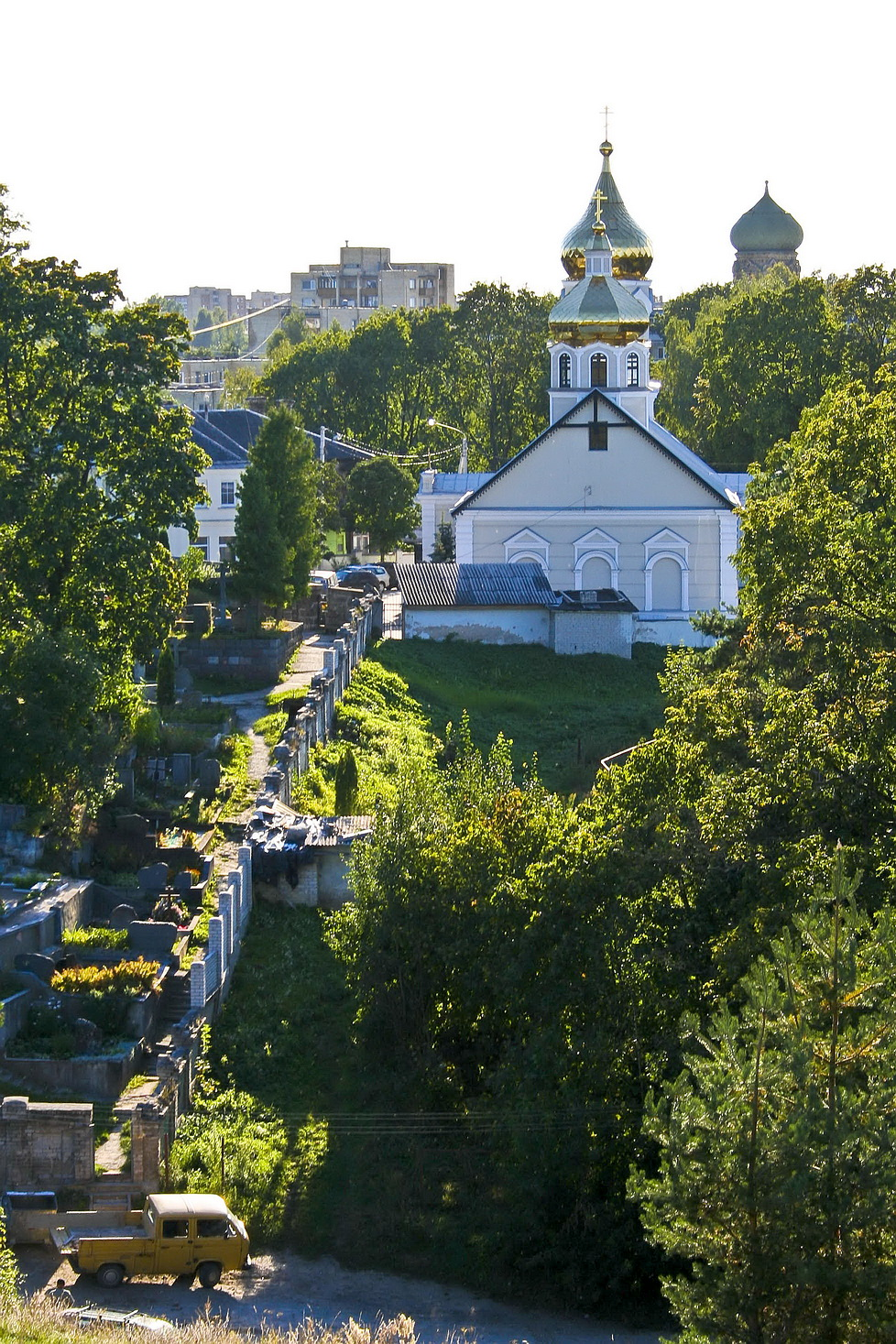
Old Believers' cemetery and chapel

Naujininkai (Polish: Nowy Świat, lit. 'New World') is one of the elderships of Vilnius, Lithuania. It is situated in the south-west of the city and lies between Vilnius International Airport and the railway station. It has an Old Believers cemetery and a church.

== History ==
Since the 19th century, the territory of Naujininkai was used as a cemetery. Naujininkai holds the only Old Believer cemetery in Vilnius. In 1825, two merchants bought a plot in Naujininkai and built a wooden meeting-house.

In the 19th century, when steam energy started to spread, many factories in the suburbs of Vilnius built chimneys, because of that Naujininkai was called Kaminai (English: chimneys). The construction of the railway in Vilnius determined the growth of the neighborhood. Industry (most of which was associated with railways), warehouses and new residential buildings started to grow.

Newcomers named many streets, such as Šaltkalvių (Metalworker), Konduktorių (Conductor) streets. Many of these names are still present in modern days.

The houses in Naujininkai are diverse. There are Soviet-era multistory blocks, old wooden houses and other types of architecture.

== See also ==
- Saint Alexander Nevsky Church in Naujininkai
