= Russian Orthodox Diocese of Lithuania =

Diocese of the Russian Orthodox Church

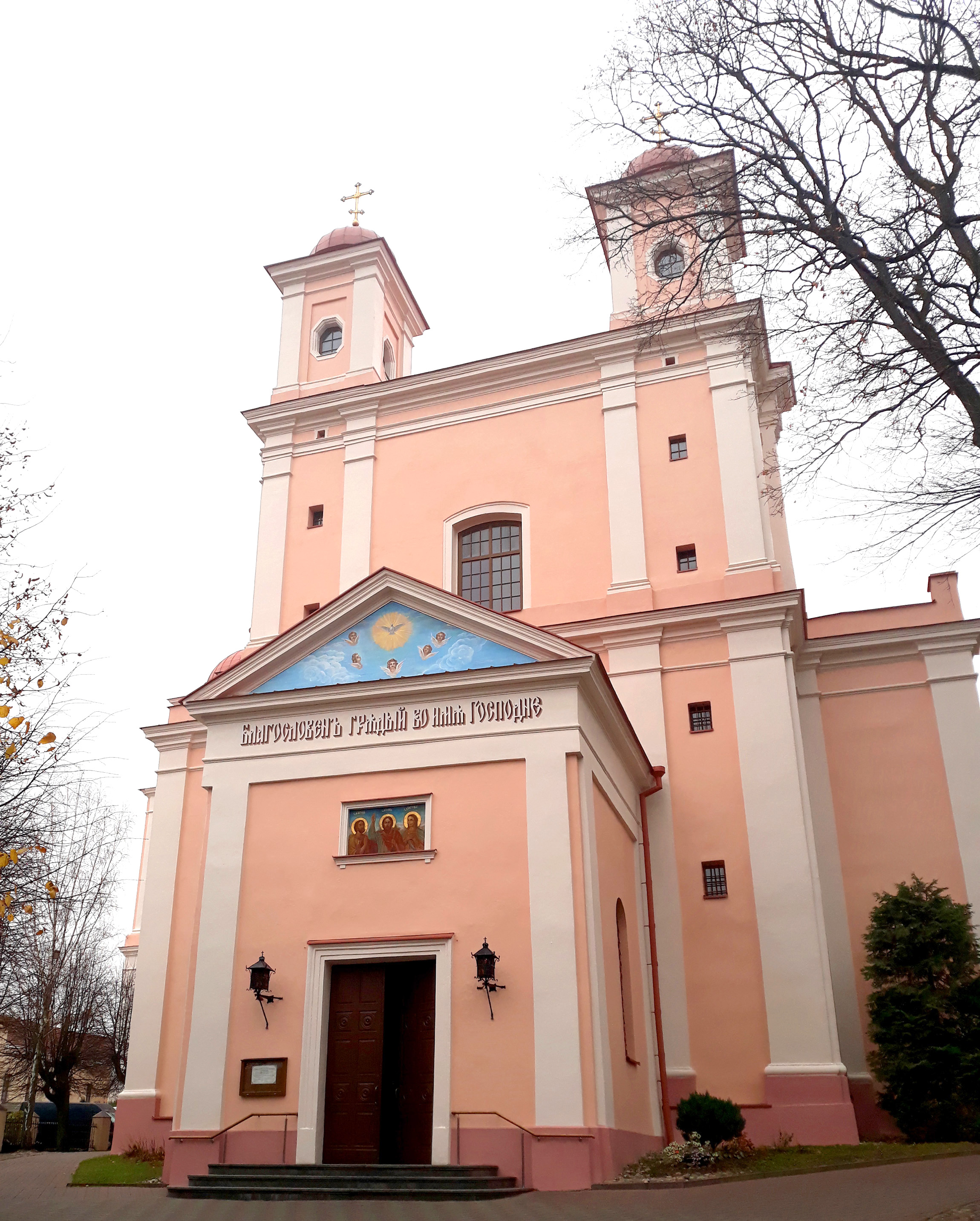
Monastery of the Holy Spirit

The Orthodox Diocese of Vilnius and Lithuania, (Note: Lithuanian: Vilniaus ir Lietuvos stačiatikių vyskupija.) also known as the Eparchy of Vilnius and Lithuania, (Note: Lithuanian: Vilniaus ir Lietuvos vyskupija. Russian: Виленская и Литовская епархия, romanized: Vilenskaya i Litovskaya eparkhija.) the Russian Orthodox Diocese of Lithuania, or the Lithuanian Orthodox Church, (Note: Lithuanian: Lietuvos stačiatikių bažnyčia. Russian: Литовская православная церковь, romanized: Litovskaya pravoslavnaya tserkov.) is an autonomous eparchy of the Russian Orthodox Church whose territory comprises the country of Lithuania. It was established in 1839 after the Synod of Polotsk when the Uniate Eparchy of Vilnius was incorporated into the Moscow Patriarchate. Its ruling bishop is confirmed by the Holy Synod of the Moscow Patriarchate upon election by the Lithuanian church body. Its headquarters is at the Holy Spirit Monastery in Vilnius, though nominally its cathedral is the Dormition Cathedral in Vilnius. Since 2010, its current head is Metropolitan Innocent (Vasilyev).

The diocese includes five deaneries, based in municipal Vilnius, regional Vilnius, Kaunas, Klaipėda, and Visaginas, with 52 parishes and two monasteries. The majority of parishioners come from the resident Slavic minorities.

In March 2026, the council of the Lithuanian Orthodox Church adopted legislation supporting a measure of independence from the Moscow Patriarchate.

== History ==
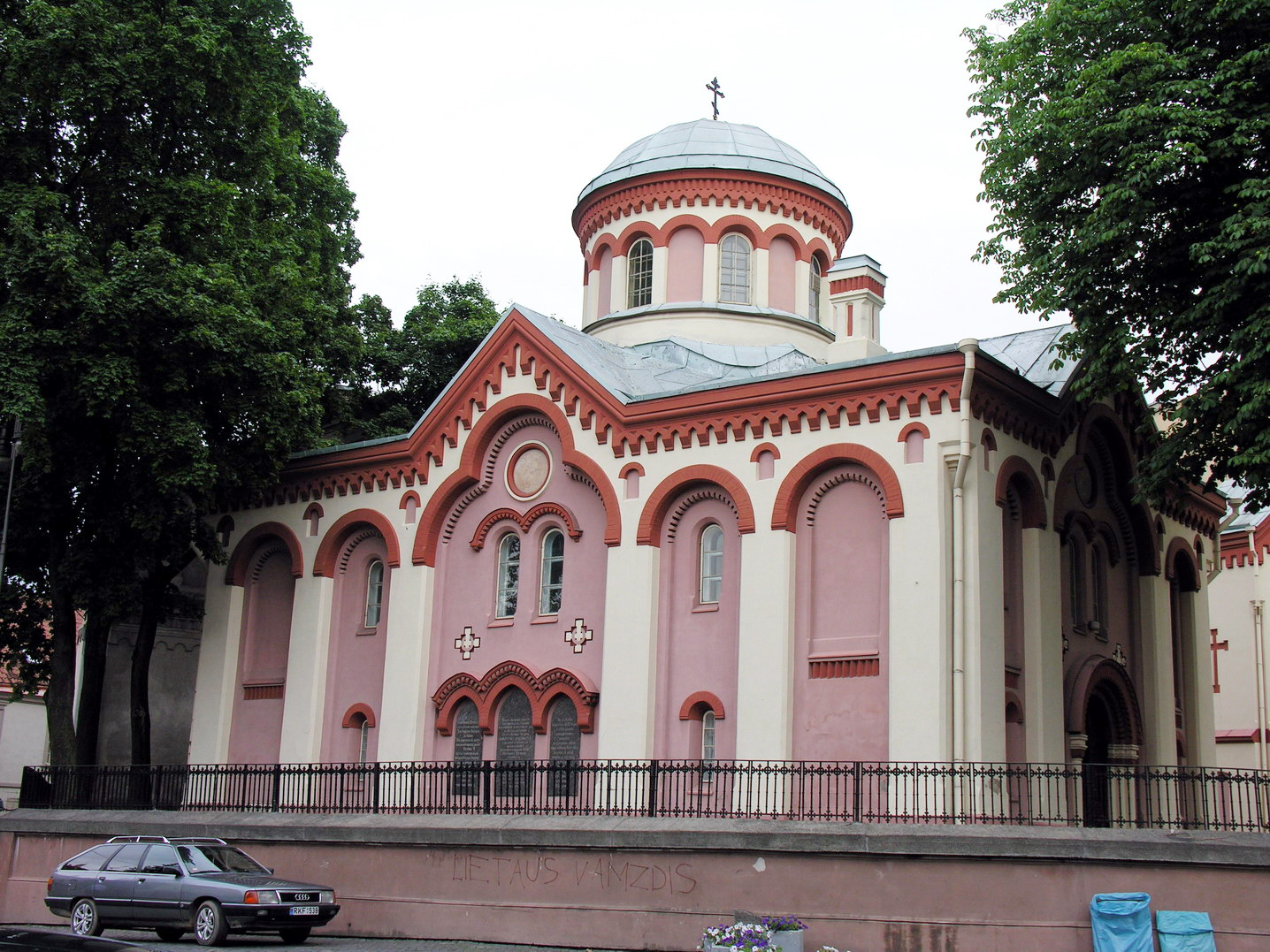
St. Parasceve Church in Vilnius, where the Three Martyrs of Vilnius were baptized

Orthodox Christianity first entered Lithuania in significant numbers in the 13th century with the conversion of some of its early nobles from paganism. Among these were the Three Martyrs of Vilnius, Anthony, John, and Eustathius, martyred in 1347 under the Grand Duke Algirdas.

Formally established Orthodox parishes in Lithuania and in the surrounding region ultimately derive from the short-lived fourteenth-century Metropolis of Lithuania (based in Navahrudak) and its successor jurisdictions (based largely in Kyiv), which had been under the Ecumenical Patriarchate of Constantinople. In the seventeenth century, the institutional presence of Orthodox Christianity was effectively erased from Lithuania as a result of the Union of Brest, when Lithuania was part of the Polish-Lithuanian Commonwealth. At that time, all the Orthodox parishes in Lithuania left the Orthodox Church and joined the Catholic Church.

In the late 18th century, with the Partitions of the Polish-Lithuanian Commonwealth, Lithuania became part of the Russian Empire. The modern Russian Orthodox diocese was founded in 1839 with the incorporation of the Uniate eparchy of Vilnius under Metropolitan Joseph Semashko into the Russian church at the Synod of Polotsk. Among the more notable hierarchs of Lithuania in the later imperial period was St. Tikhon (Bellavin), who served in the post 1913–1917. Most of the Orthodox parishes that exist today in Lithuania were built during the imperial period (1795–1918).

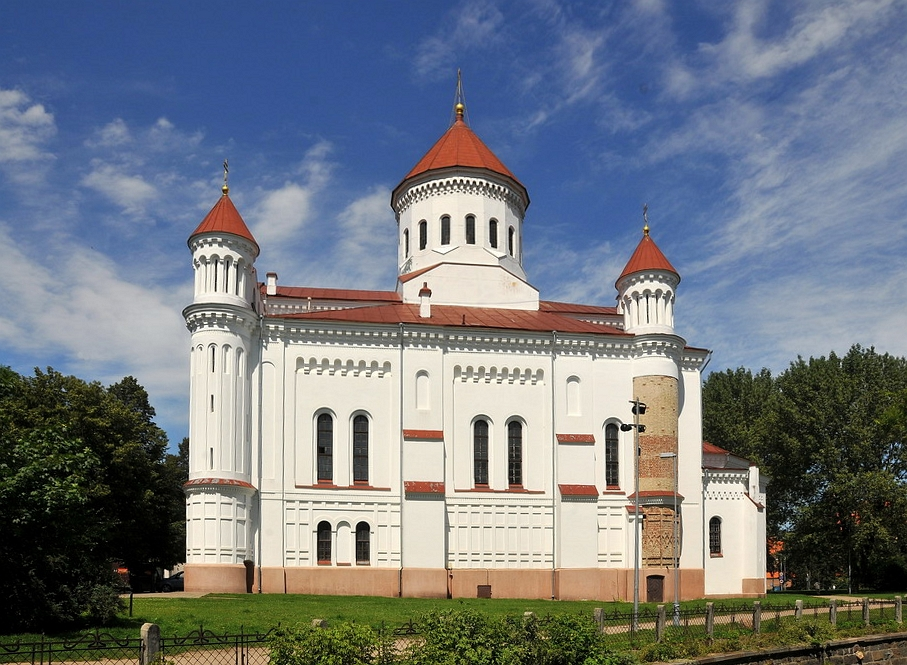
Dormition Cathedral, Vilnius

The diocese functioned within the Russian Empire until Lithuania became independent in 1918. At that time, a number of the churches that had been taken from the Catholic Church were returned, and certain Orthodox churches, such as Archangel Michael Church in Kaunas, were also given to the Catholic Church.

In the wake of World War I, part of Lithuania (the Republic of Central Lithuania) was controlled by Poland, including the capital Vilnius. After the autocephaly of the Polish Orthodox Church in 1924, the parishes in that region were part of the Polish church.

As a result of World War II, Lithuania again became subjugated to Russia, this time as part of the Soviet Union, which transferred Vilnius into the Lithuanian SSR and moved the parishes that had been part of the Polish church back to the Moscow Patriarchate. While religion was persecuted in Soviet Lithuania just as it was elsewhere in the Soviet Union, the Orthodox diocese was generally tolerated more than the Roman Catholic Church (to which the great majority of Lithuanians belonged), because its seat of authority was inside the Soviet Union.

In 1990, Lithuania again regained independence. The head of the diocese at the time, Archbishop Chrysostom (Martishkin), openly supported Lithuanian independence. He was succeeded in 2010 by Metropolitan Innocent (Vasilyev).

== 2020s schism ==
=== Status controversy during the Russian invasion of Ukraine ===
After the full-scale Russian invasion of Ukraine began on 24 February 2022, Patriarch Kirill of Moscow publicly declared his full support of the Russian military aggression, calling it a "holy war". The Orthodox clergy and laity in Lithuania responded negatively, and were united in their support for Ukraine. In a letter to the Orthodox Christian community on 17 March 2022, Metropolitan Innocent (Inokentiy, proper name Vasilyev) of Vilnius stated: "As you probably have already noticed, Patriarch Kirill and I have different political views and perception of current events. His political statements on the war in Ukraine are his personal opinion. We in Lithuania do not agree with it. I would like to openly state here that we, the Orthodox in Lithuania, having the opportunity to independently solve our intra-church affairs, will continue to strive for even greater church independence, believing that the Lord grants such in His own time." He appealed to Moscow to grant the Archdiocese of Vilnius and Lithuania the status of a self-governing church.

Ever since 2022, the Diocese of Vilnius and Lithuania has made efforts to change its perceived identity by modifying its self-image, emphasising its Lithuanian identity in an attempt to distance itself from Moscow. Since issue 2023(6):1 of its bilingual newspaper Orthodox Lithuania (Stačiatikių Lietuva/"Православная Литва"), the diocese began calling itself "Lithuanian Orthodox Church" (Lietuvos Stačiatikių Bažnyčia), while using "Orthodox Church in Lithuania" (Stačiatikių Bažnyčia Lietuvoje) in other official texts. According to researchers Bielousova & Zaicevas (2025), the Diocese is thereby "creating the illusion of autonomy. However, unlike the Estonian and Latvian Orthodox Churches, which have canonical self-governing status, the Diocese [of Vilnius and Lithuania] does not have such a status." They noted several other strategies and tactics used by the Diocese to signal its apparent loyalty to Lithuania, whilst also giving mixed messages by celebrating Russian saints, using the controversial formulation "на Украине" rather than the neutral "в Украине" in the Russian-language edition of Orthodox Lithuania, and emphasising the importance of authority, hierarchy and church unity in the face of dissent, criticism, and opposition from within the Orthodox Church in various countries. An article in Orthodox Lithuania 2024(16):4 openly expressed hostility to both the Orthodox Church of Ukraine (OCU) as well as the new Exarchate of Lithuania, both aligned with the Ecumenical Patriarchate of Constantinople ("portrayed as an external player interfering in internal affairs of churches subordinate to the Moscow Patriarchate"), and rejected them as "non-canonical", "splitters", "schismatics", "illegitimate", and "collaborators", thereby aligning itself fully with the Moscow Patriarchate's position.

In January 2026, Russia's Foreign Intelligence Service and Ministry of Foreign Affairs issued a joint statement, claiming that Ecumenical Patriach Bartholomew I of Constantinople was an "antichrist" or "incarnate devil", working to drive Russian Orthodoxy out of Lithuania, Latvia, and Estonia, through acts such as establishing a separate Exarchate of Lithuania. Both the Constantinople-aligned Exarchate priest Gintaras Sungaila and Moscow-aligned Metropolitan Innocent condemned the insults, with the latter adding: "Peace between confessions is also important to us, and we oppose religious wars in any form."

According to the February 2026 National Threat Assessment report of the State Security Department of Lithuania, although "the diocese's leadership publicly condemned the war and repeatedly announced its strive for greater independence from the Moscow Patriarchate[,] no significant changes have occurred in this regard so far." The report continued: "Even if the diocese had been granted this status, the Patriarchate would still have significant influence over the most important management decisions, including the appointment of church leaders, the formation of management bodies, and the approval of court decisions. All Patriarchate decisions would also continue to apply to the diocese. We assess that the Diocese of Vilnius and Lithuania is seeking partial self-government in order to avoid public criticism of its subordination to the Moscow Patriarchate while still remaining entirely under its influence." The Department also concluded that the Moscow Patriarchate regarded the establishment of the Constantinople–aligned Exarchate of Lithuania as "a threat to its interests", and would try to limit its activities in order to maintain its own influence over Lithuania.

=== Dissent and the Exarchate of Lithuania ===
In April 2022, two priests contacted the Archdiocese, saying they could no longer commemorate Patriarch Kirill's name during the divine liturgy, as that went against their conscience. In May 2022, Metropolitan Innocent suspended them and three other priests "violating the priestly oath and disobedience to the ruling hierarch." Meanwhile, Mayor Remigijus Šimašius of Vilnius publicly supported the dissidents and proposed to return jurisdiction over the Lithuanian Orthodox Church from Moscow back to Constantinople, as it was before 1686. In May 2022, Prime Minister Ingrida Šimonytė of Lithuania wrote a letter directly to Ecumenical Patriarch Bartholomew of Constantinople in support of the five suspended priests, saying "They have the right to practice their faith without a conflict of conscience." In June 2022, the Church Court dismissed the five dissident priests from the priesthood for violation of the Church's canons. In July 2022, Metropolitan Innocent of Vilnius and Lithuania defrocked the five priests from the diocese of Vilnius and Lithuania for "serious canonical violations", including but not limited to organising with another church's jurisdiction.

The five priests turned to the Ecumenical Patriarch of Constantinople, asking to either be reinstated, or to switch jurisdiction from the Moscow Patriarchate to the Ecumenical Patriarchate of Constantinople. In August 2022, the five dissident priests and their supporters established the Centre for Initiatives of Orthodox Christians (KOIC), a non-governmental organisation to oppose Patriarch Kirill. It stated: "KOIC unites Orthodox believers, who do not accept the politicization of the Moscow Patriarchate. The community includes local believers of various nationalities, Ukrainian refugees, Belarusian and Russian dissidents." On 6 November 2022, a dissident Orthodox community service organised by KOIC was held in Vilnius, with the participation of like-minded believers from Klaipėda, opposing the Moscow Patriarchate and reiterating the request to transfer jurisdiction to the Ecumenical Patriarchate.

On 17 February 2023, the Ecumenical Patriarch reinstated the five dissidents in their priestly ministry, granting them permission to resume leading the liturgy on 3 March. In response, Metropolitan Innocent announced he would not accept the priests' restoration; he did, however, allow the parish of St Parasceve in Vilnius "to celebrate a mass for refugees from Ukraine, without mentioning the name of the Moscow Patriarch Kirill." In March 2023, Patriarch Bartholomew paid an official visit to Lithuania, signing a cooperation agreement with the Prime Minister of Lithuania on closer relations and cooperation. The Patriarch also met with the five restored priests and provided for the creation of the ecclesiastical jurisdiction of the Ecumenical Patriarchate in the country. The Holy Synod of the Ecumenical Patriarchate established the Exarchate of the Ecumenical Patriarchate in Lithuania on 1 May 2023.

In January 2024, Justinus Kiviloo, a priest of the Estonian Apostolic Orthodox Church, was appointed as the Exarch of Lithuania. On 7 February 2024, the Ministry of Justice of Lithuania granted official recognition to the Exarchate of the Ecumenical Patriarchate in Lithuania as an independent organization in the Register of Legal Entities. Archpriest Vitalijus Mockus estimated that about 15 to 20% of the clergy and laity of the Russian Archdiocese had left to join the Constantinople-aligned Exarchate. As of May 2024, the Exarchate of Lithuania included 10 parishes (communities) and 10 priests, serving the liturgy in the Lithuanian, Belarusian, Ukrainian and Russian languages. The Russian Archdiocese of Vilnius and Lithuania, also known as the Lithuanian Orthodox Church, still had 5 deaneries, 50 parishes, 62 clergy, 1 male and 1 female monastery.

== See also ==
- Christianity in Lithuania

== Bibliography ==
- Bielousova, Gražina; Zaicevas, Deividas (9 July 2025). "Maskvos patriarchato stačiatikių vyskupijos Lietuvoje diskurso adaptacijos 2022–2024 metais" [Discoursive Adaptation of the Moscow Patriarchate's Orthodox Diocese in Lithuania (2022–2024)]. Sociologija. Mintis ir veiksmas (in Lithuanian). 54 (1): 64–92. doi:10.15388/SocMintVei.2024.1.3. ISSN 2335-8890.
