= Didieji Pupojai =

- City neighborhood
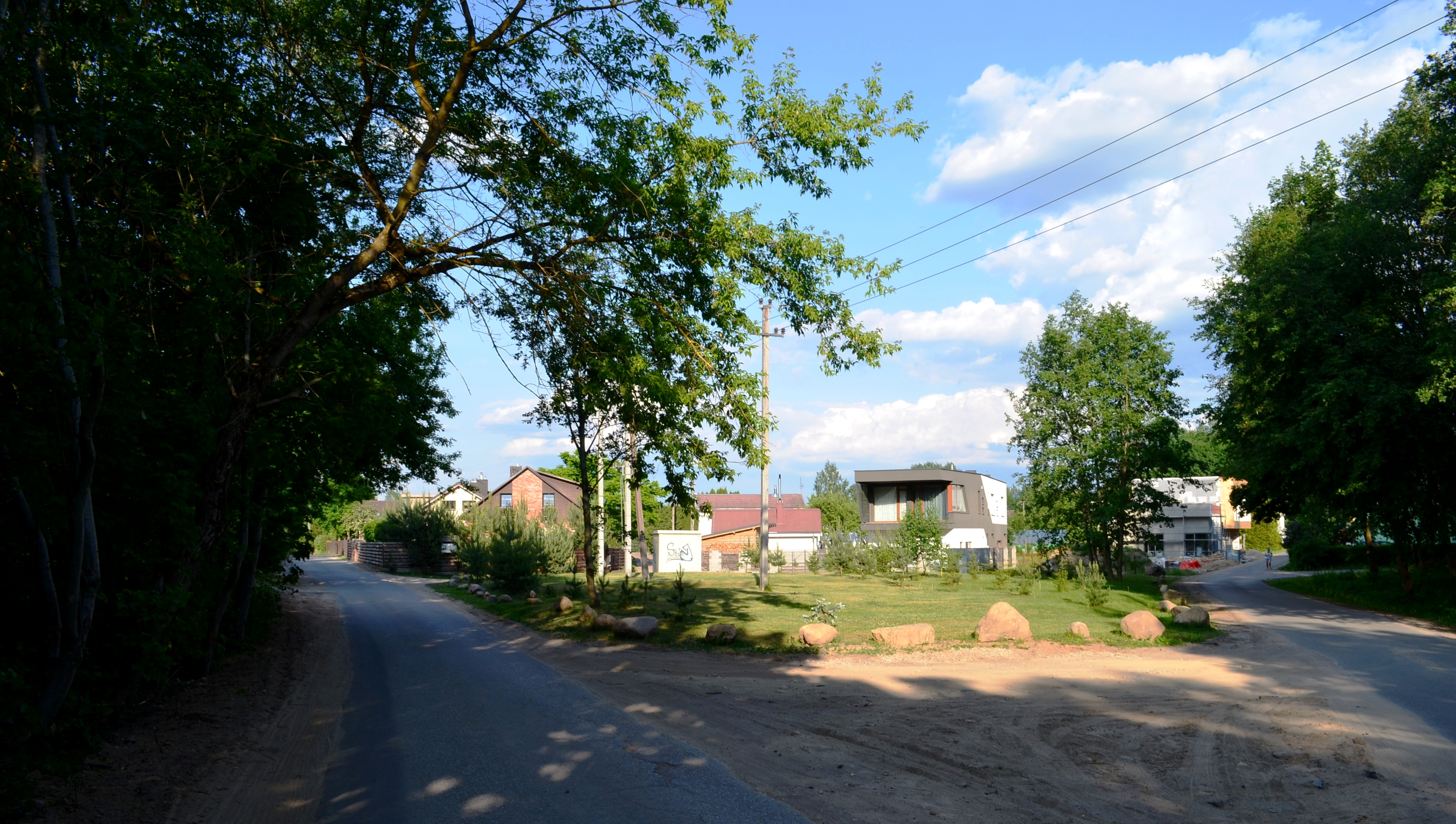

- Location of Didieji Pupojai
- Coordinates: 54°43′05″N 25°23′31″E
- Country: Lithuania
- County: Vilnius County
- Municipality: Vilnius city municipality
- Time zone: UTC+2 (EET)
  - Summer (DST): UTC+3 (EEST)

Didieji Pupojai is a neighbourhood of Vilnius located in the Antakalnis Eldership. It is situated northeast from the city center and east of Antakalnis. It borders Dvarčionys from the north, Kalnai and Mileišiškės from the southwest, Rokantiškės from the south, and Mažieji Pupojai from the southeast.

It is a mostly residential area made up of community gardens and private houses. The area has a small cemetery.
