= Castle Hill (Vilnius) =

Hill in Vilnius, Lithuania

Coordinates: 54.6868°N 25.2915°E

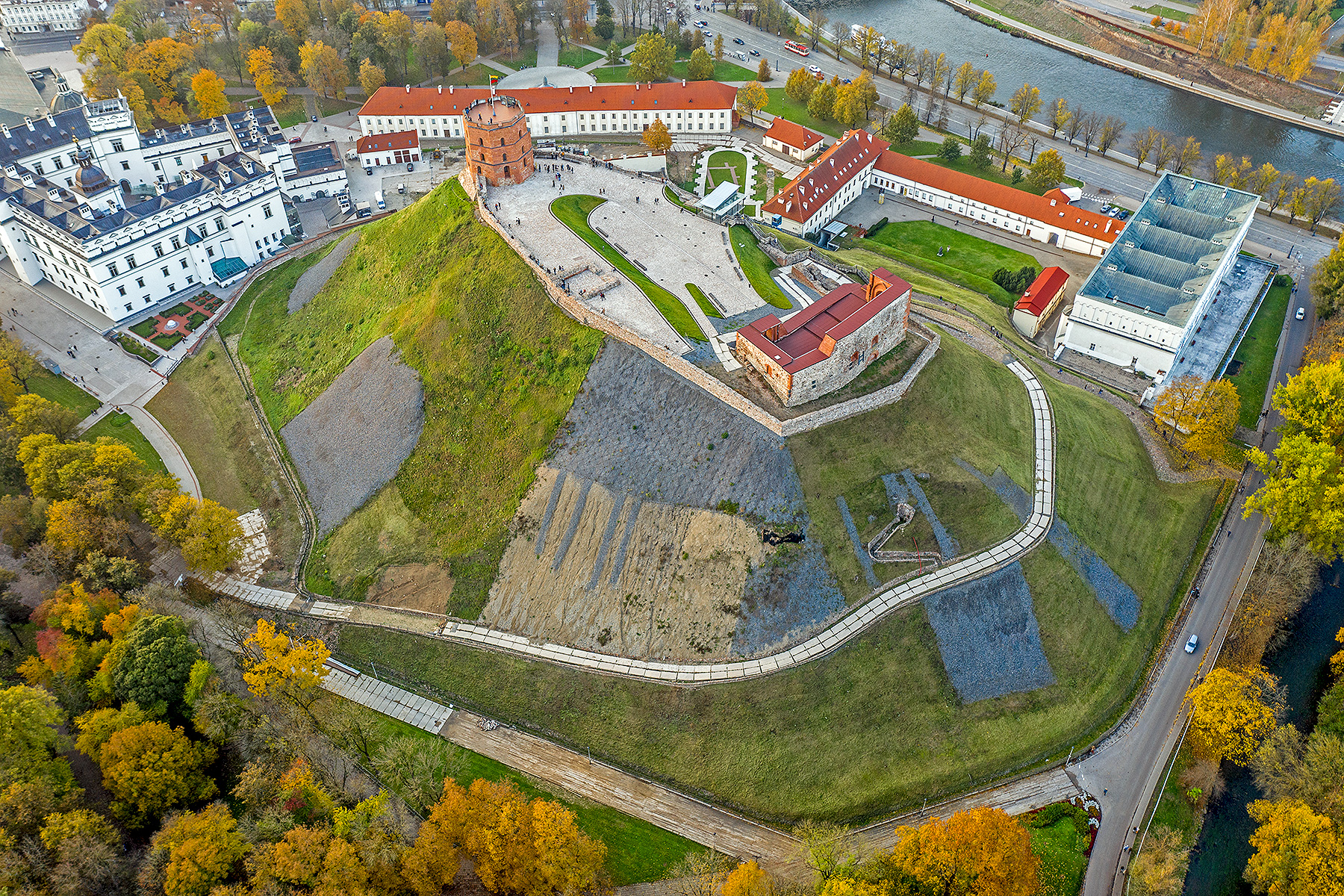
Castle Hill, 2020

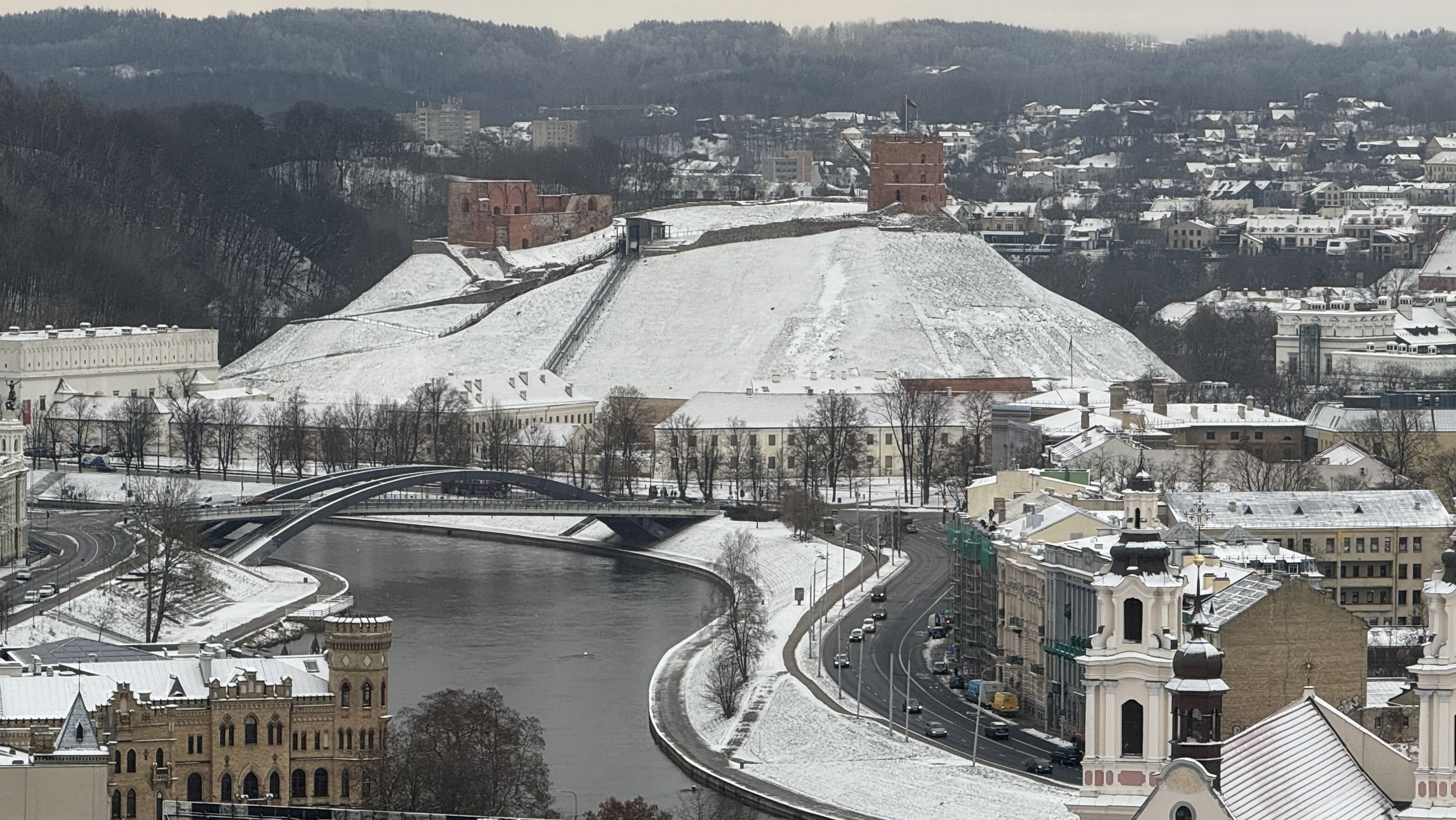
View in winter, with Žygimantų Street

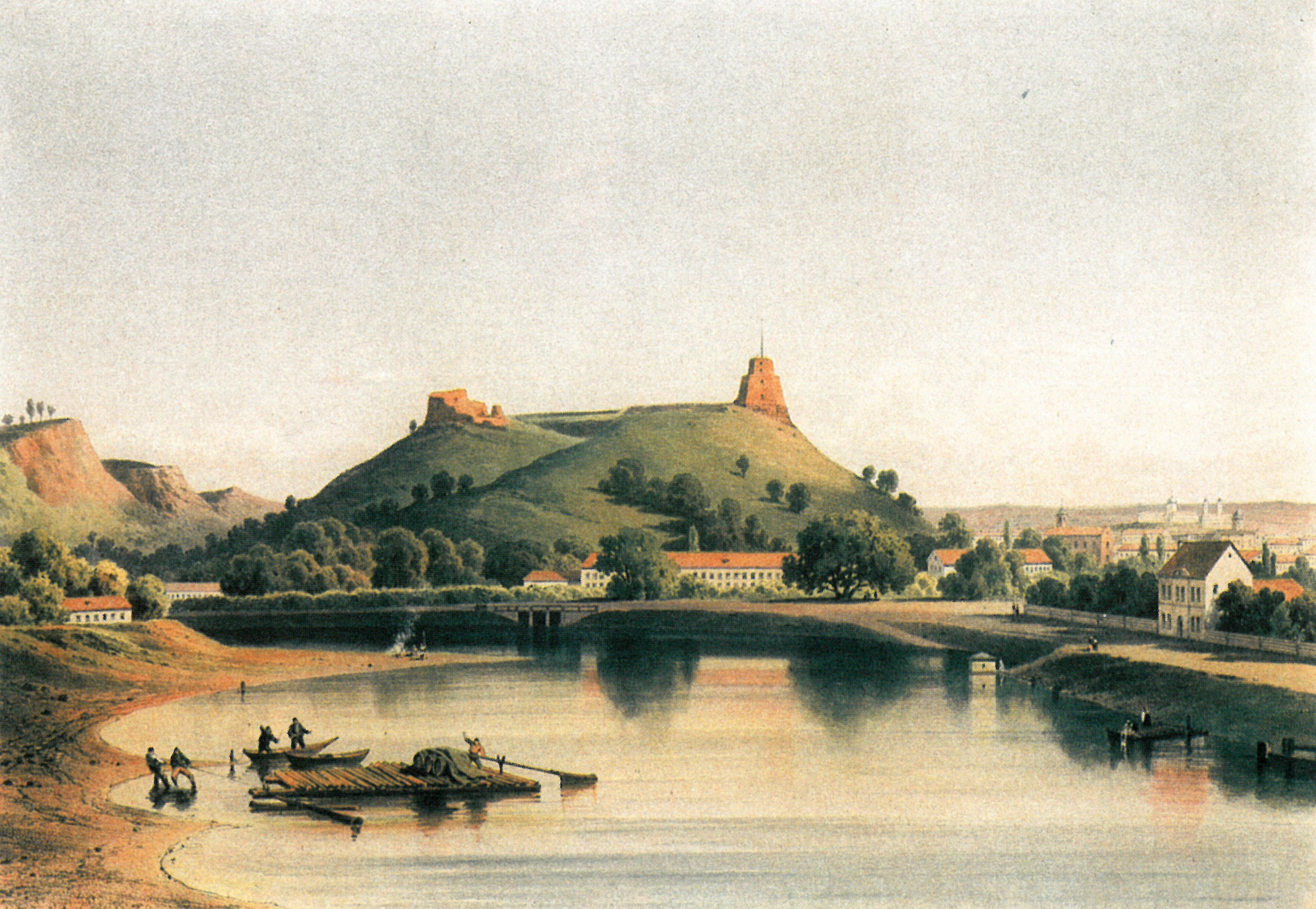
Castle Hil, 1870

Castle Hill (Lithuanian: Pilies kalnas) or Gediminas' Hill (Lithuanian: Gedimino kalnas) is a hill in Vilnius, Lithuania at the confluence of Neris and Vilnia rivers on the left side of the Vilnia. It is best known as the location of the Gediminas' Tower, a signature landmark of Vilnius, a remnant of the fortified Upper Castle dating to the Middle Ages. Castle Hill is part of the Vilnius Castles Cultural Reserve.

== Description ==
The hill was originally formed by erosion, but has been reshaped by man. It has been separated from the southwestern part of the Sapieginė erosive deposit by a canal, which forms the mouth of the Vilnia. Mindaugas Pakalnis, the Chief architect of Vilnius, remarked that hill's erosiveness contributed to its defensive value, because it is difficult to climb the collapsing slopes.

The top of the hill is 142 m above sea level and 48 m above the surrounding land, with its slopes at an angle of 35 to 40 degrees. It used to be almost treeless, but from around the beginning of the 20th century trees grew on its slopes. These were cut down in 2011–2013 during slope management, when the hill acquired its current shape. The hill has an oval flat top 110–120 m long by 50–60 m wide, where the Upper Castle was built. In the 21st century the erosion of the slopes intensified and there were a series of landslides. Among the suspected reasons were the construction of the Gediminas Hill Lift, large-scale construction works related to the restoration of the Palace of the Grand Dukes of Lithuania at the foot of the hill, and economomic activities in the area, as well as a general neglect of maintenance. Weather conditions also contributed to the deterioration of the slopes. Slope stabilization works were carried out in 2017–2022.

== See also ==
- Vilnius Castle Complex
- Hill of Three Crosses, located some 300 m to the east of Castle Hill, across the River Vilnia
