= Kalnai =

- City neighborhood
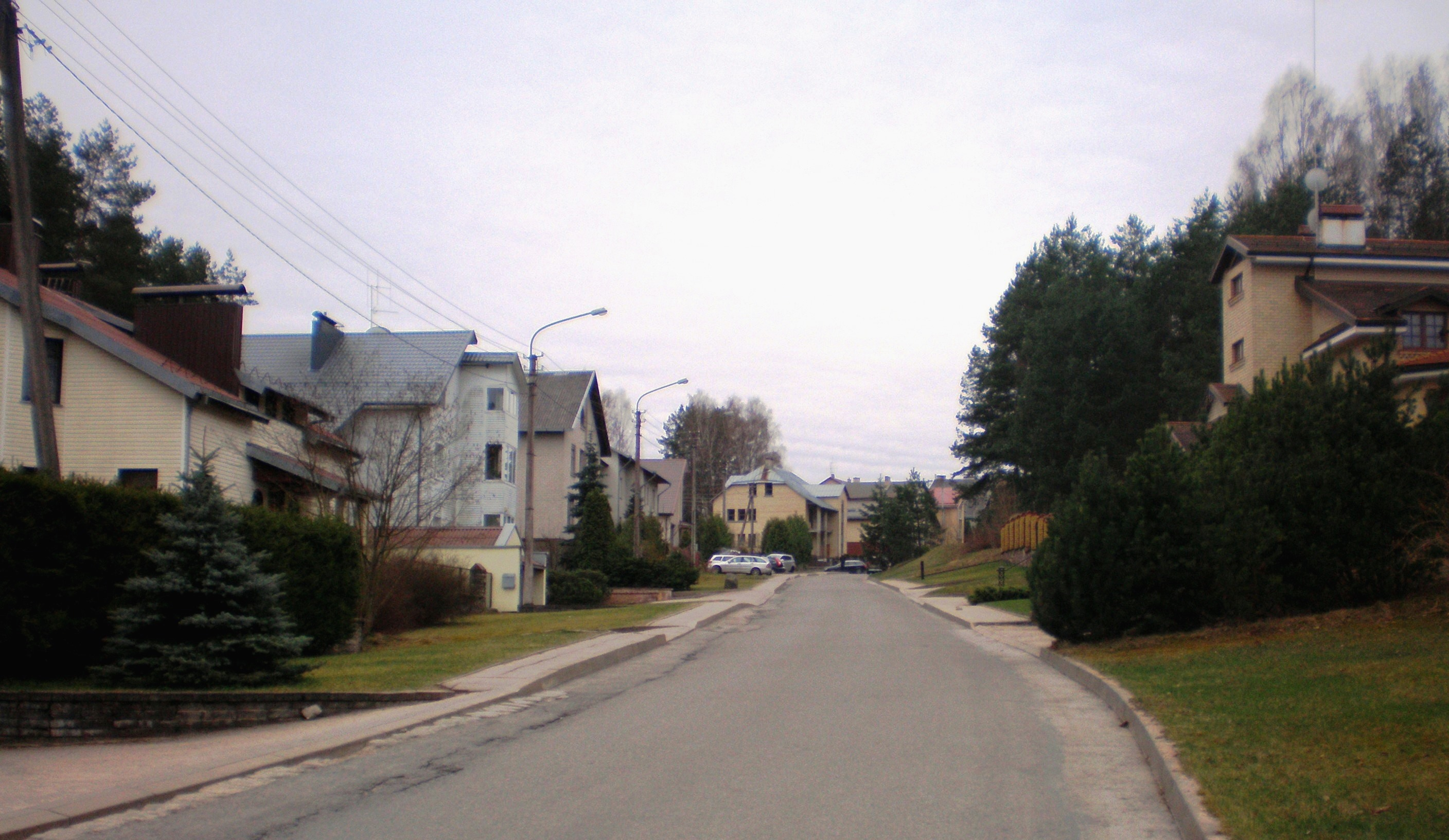
- Moliakalnio street in Kalnai

- Location of Dvarčionys
- Coordinates: 54°43′26″N 25°21′58″E
- Country: Lithuania
- County: Vilnius County
- Municipality: Vilnius city municipality
- Time zone: UTC+2 (EET)
  - Summer (DST): UTC+3 (EEST)

Kalnai (literally Lithuanian: 'the mountains', Polish: Górajce) is a neighborhood of Vilnius located in the Antakalnis Eldership. It is situated northeast from the city center and southwest from Dvarčionys.

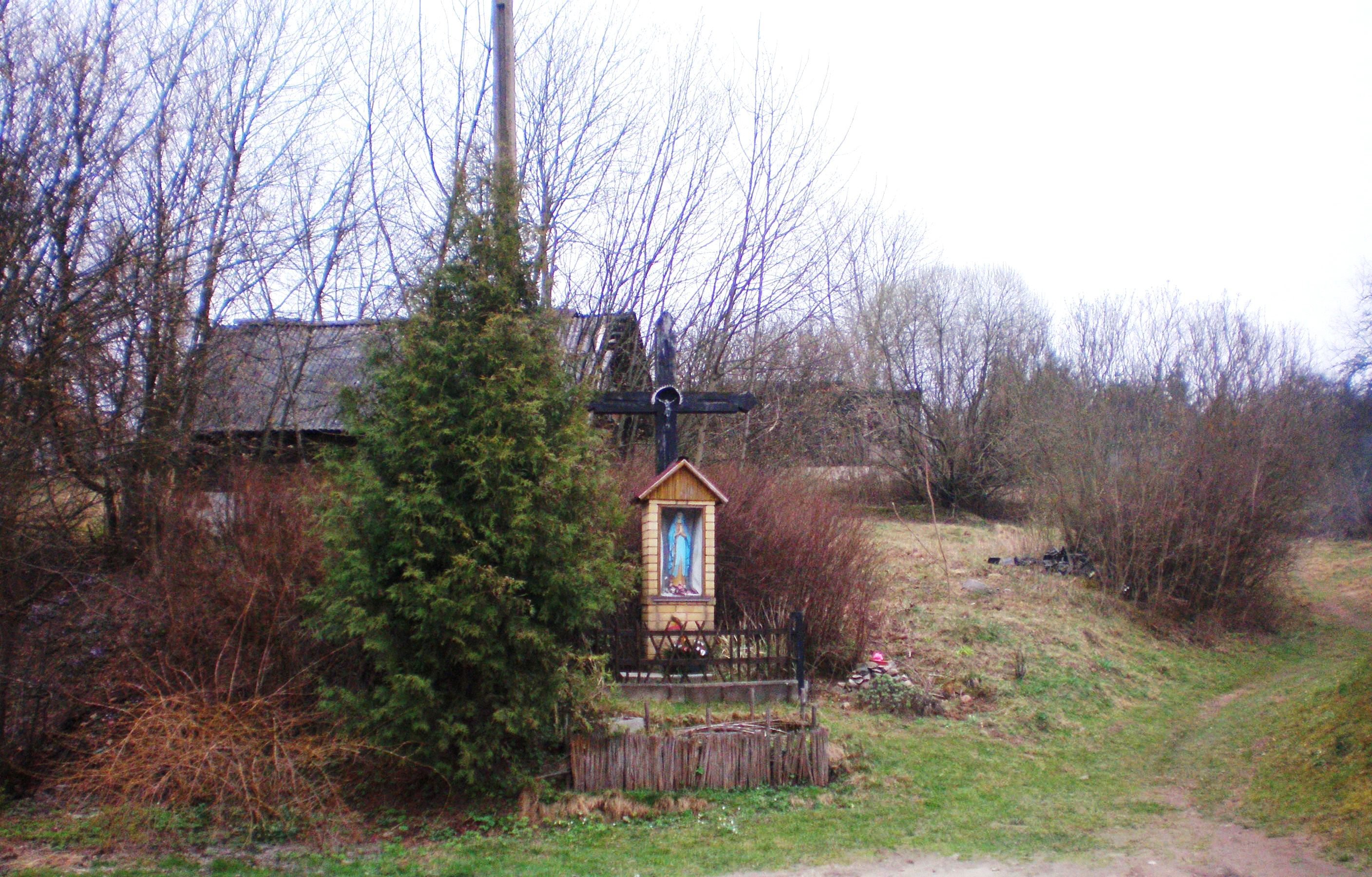
A chapel with a cross near Moliakalnio street
