= Antakalnis =

Eldership in Vilnius, Lithuania

- Eldership
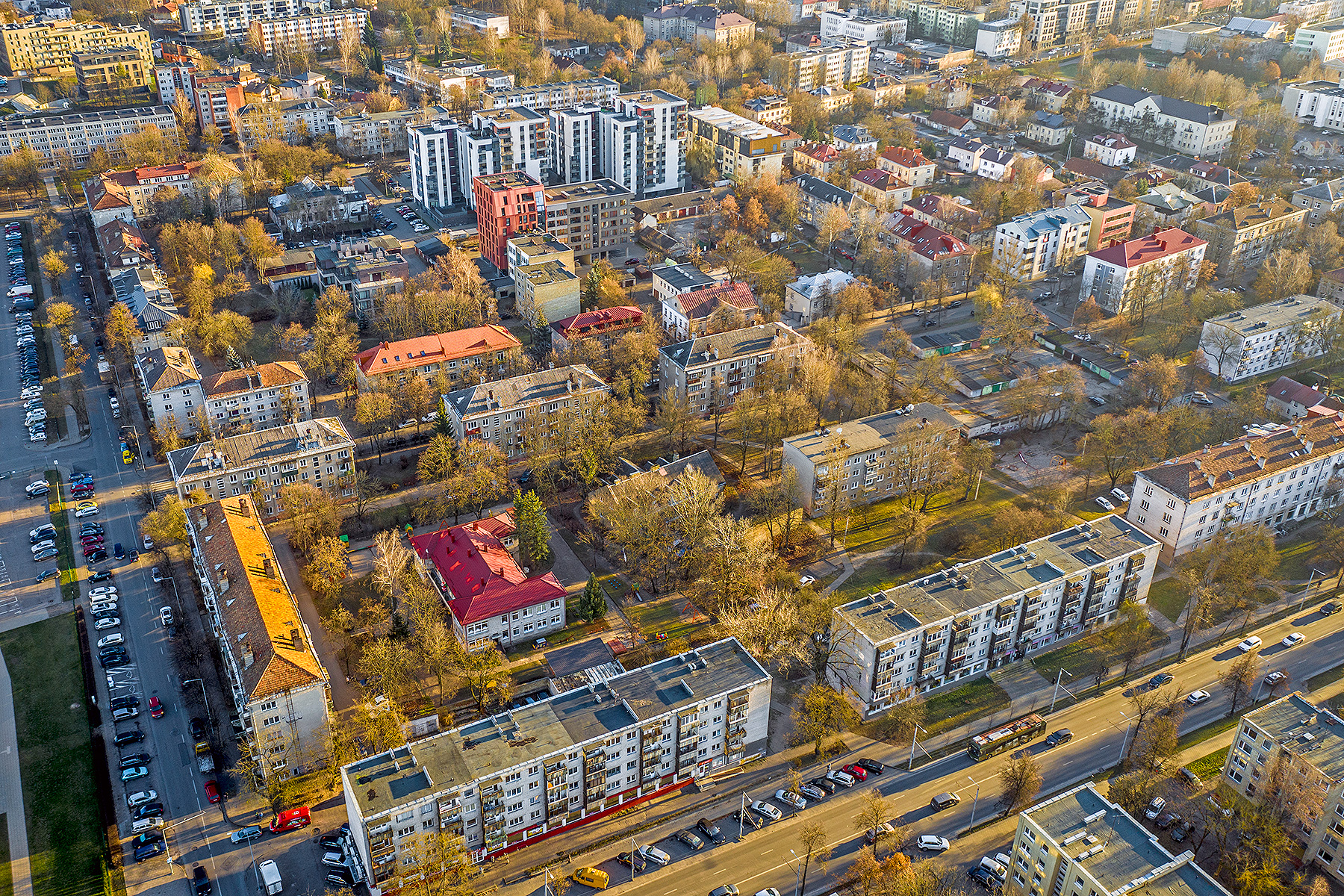
- Aerial view of Antakalnis

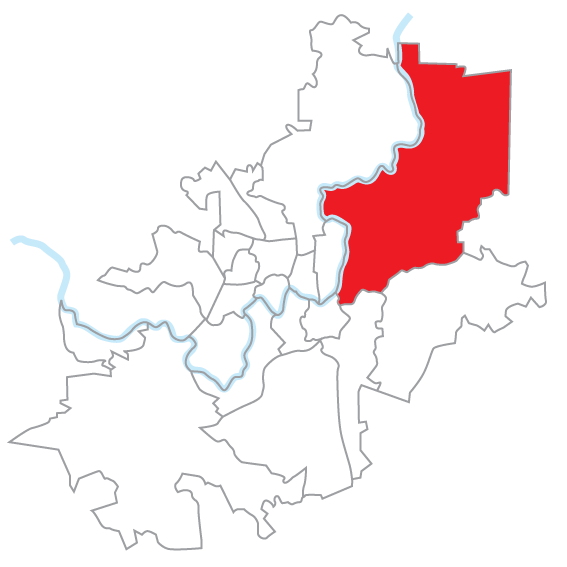

- Location of Antakalnis
- Country: Lithuania
- County: Vilnius County
- Municipality: Vilnius City Municipality
- Elder: Mantas Ilgūnas

Area
  - Total: 77.14 km^{2} (29.78 sq mi)
  - Rank: 2nd in (Vilnius)

Population (2023 December)
  - Total: 43,540
  - Density: 564.43/km^{2} (1,461.9/sq mi)
- Time zone: UTC+2 (EET)
  - Summer (DST): UTC+3 (EEST)
- Website: antakalnis.lt

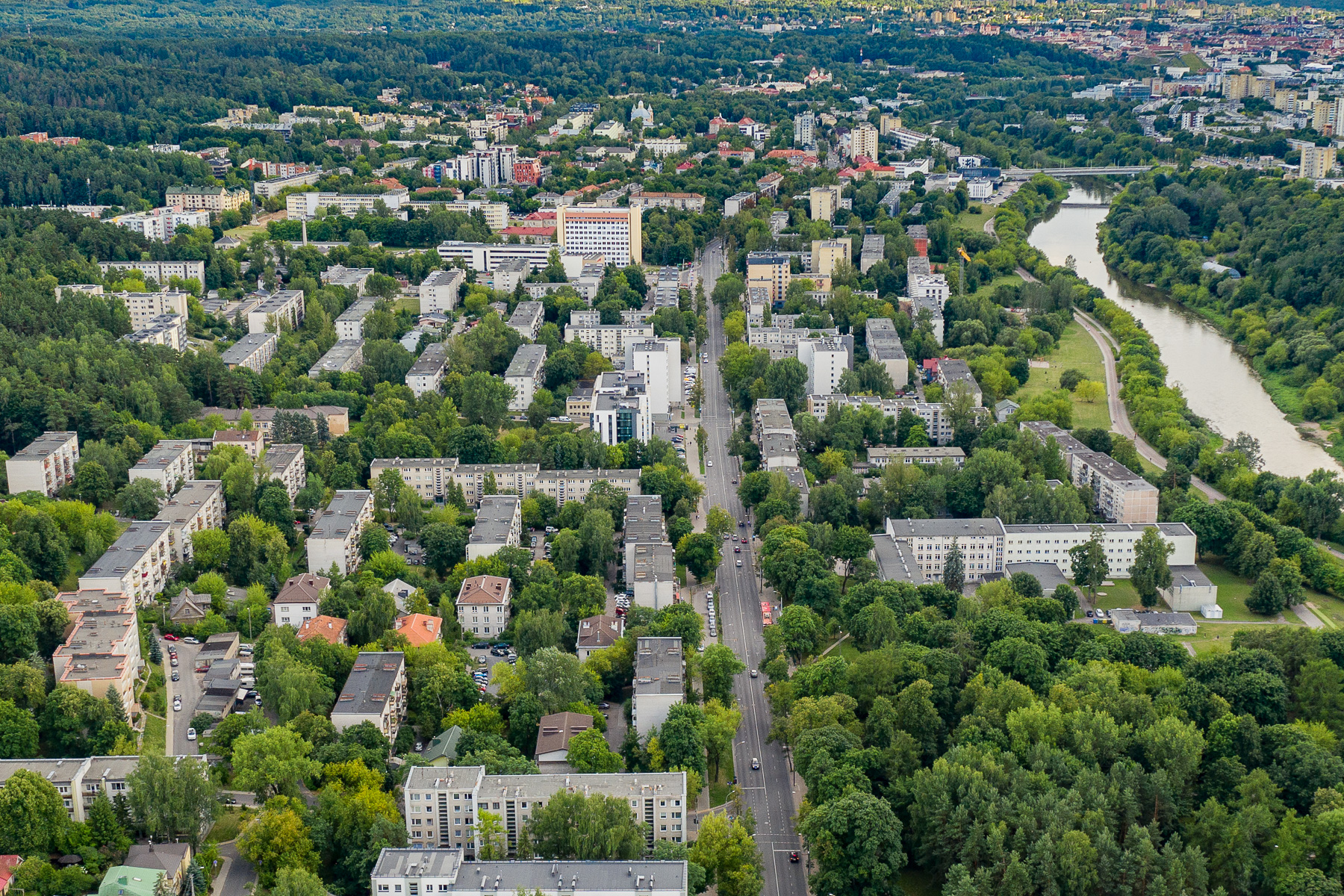
Panorama

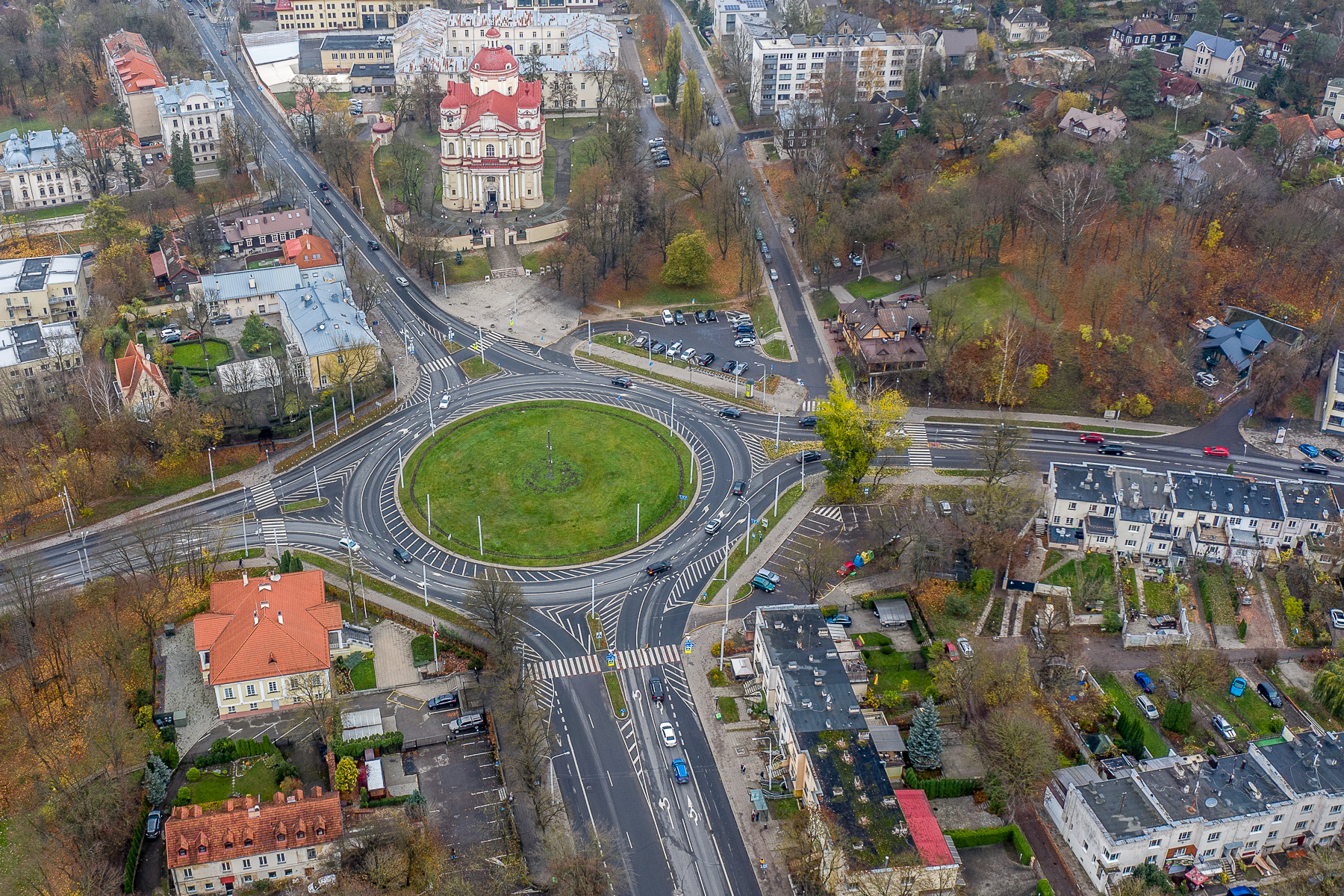
Olandų žiedas (Dutch Roundabout)

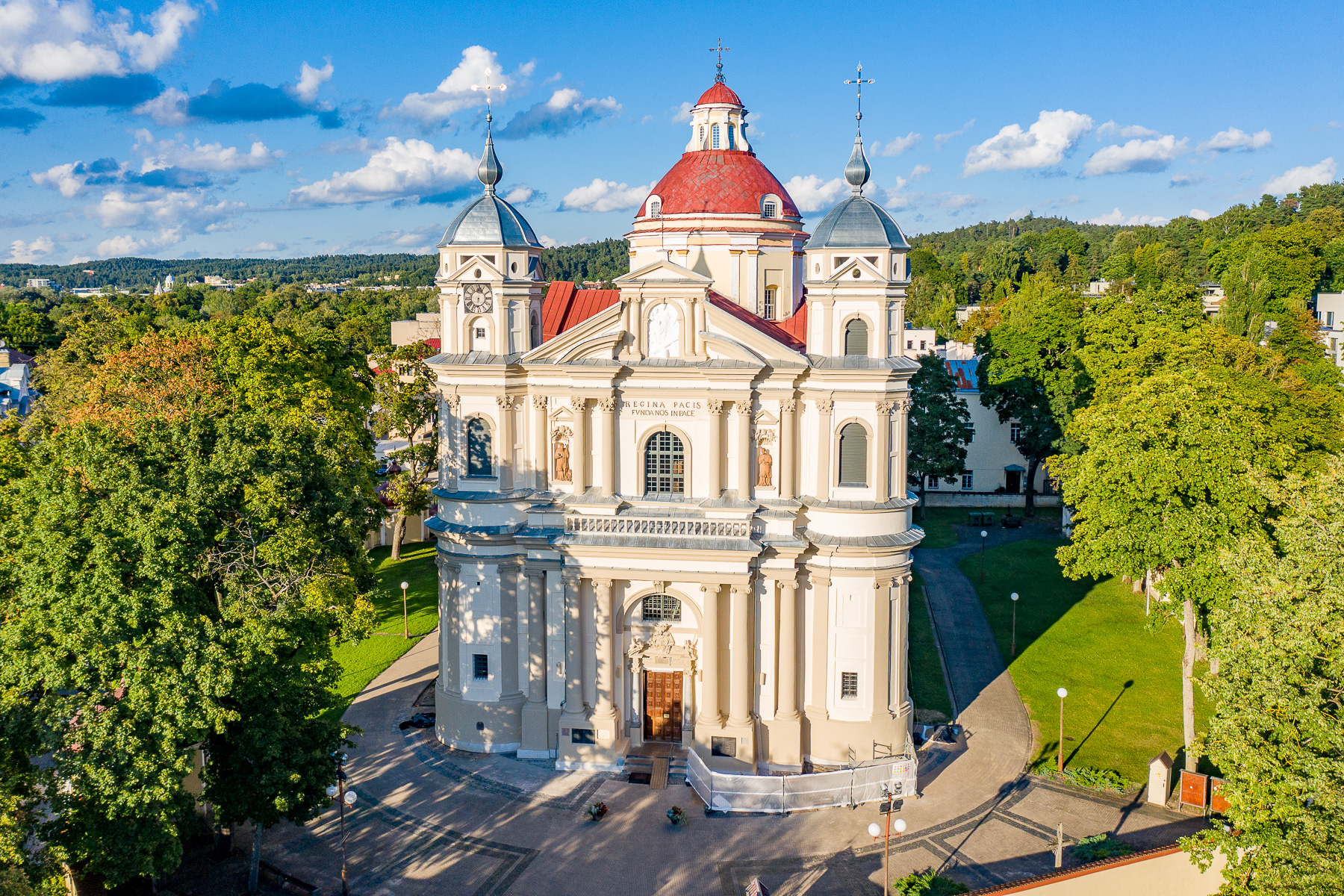
Church of St. Peter and St. Paul

Antakalnis (literally Lithuanian: 'the place on the mountain') is an eldership in Vilnius, Lithuania. Antakalnis is one of the oldest, and largest historical suburbs of Vilnius. It is in the Eastern section of Vilnius, along the left bank of the Neris, with the river running along the whole Western side of the district. Antakalnis Eldership is the second-largest in Vilnius, with an area of 77.14 km^{2} (29.78 sq mi).

One of the greatest Lithuanian Baroque masterpieces, the Roman Catholic Church of St. Peter and St. Paul, is in Antakalnis, as is Sapieha Palace (Sapiegų rūmai). Sapieha Palace is surrounded by the only surviving Baroque-style park in Lithuania, which contains the oldest linden tree in Vilnius.

Antakalnis is home to the historically important Antakalnis Cemetery, where victims of the January Events in 1991, killed by the Soviet Army, are buried; their graves are often visited, as they are considered national heroes of Lithuania.

Antakalnis Eldership includes the recreational area and prestigious cottage district Valakampiai, where two river beaches have been established. The current and former president of Lithuania, the prime minister of Lithuania, and other state officials reside in the Turniškės neighborhood of Antakalnis.

The Botanical Garden of Vilnius University lies in Kairėnai, the settlement in the Eastern part of the district.

== Etymology ==
The name derives from the prefix anta- (meaning "on") and the word kalnas (meaning a "hill", a "mountain"), as the eldership is situated in the highlands, among the hills. In other languages the eldership was formerly referred to as Antokol in Polish.

The Jewish surnames Antokolec, Antokolsky and variants derive from the Polish pronunciation of the eldership's name.

== History ==
1778 picture

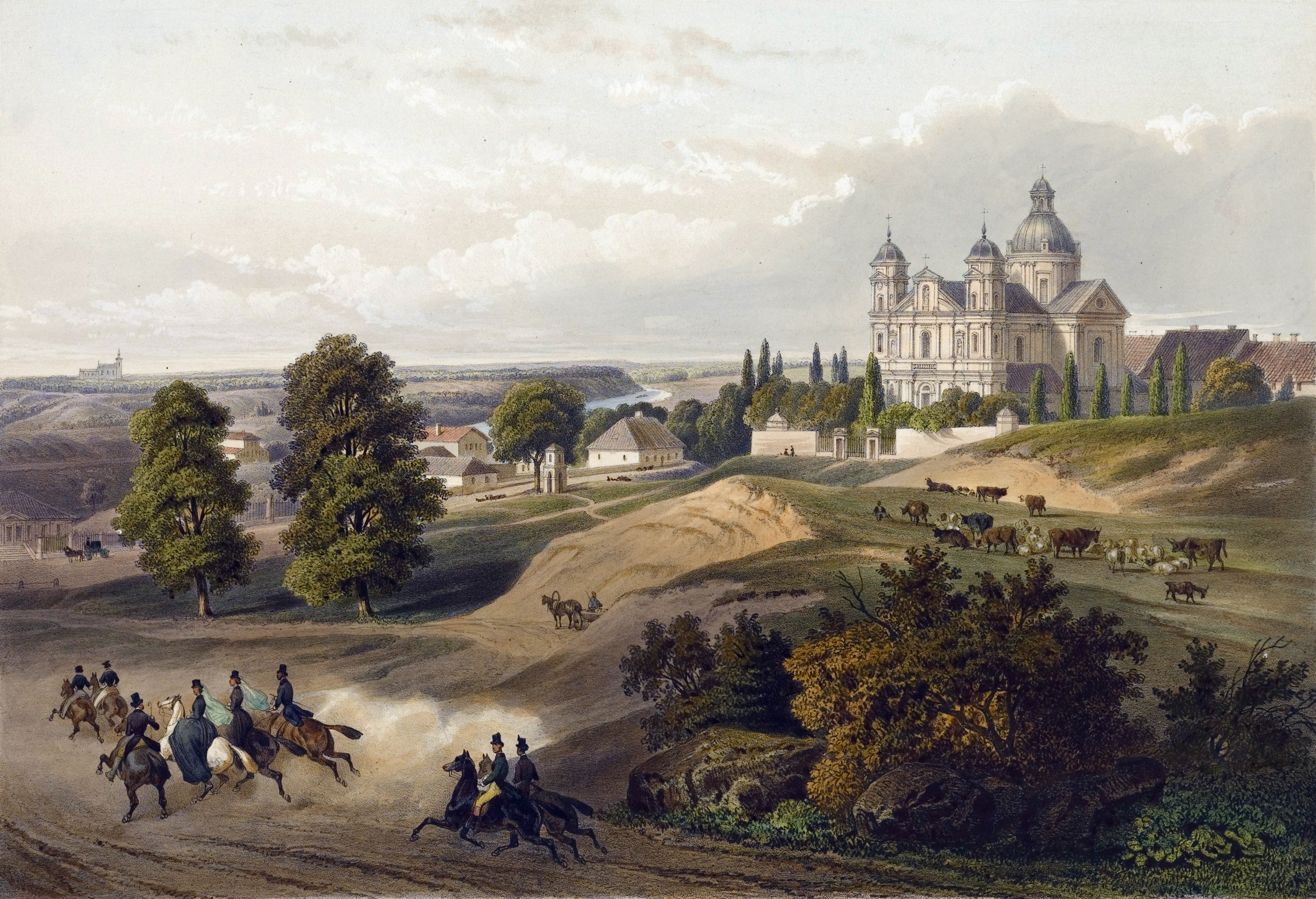
Panorama in 1848

Antakalnis is one of the oldest parts of Vilnius. Historically, the suburb of Antakalnis developed along a road to Aukštaitija and Viršupis Manor, the summer palace of the grand dukes.

== Areas ==
Antakalnis eldership includes these city parts: Aukštagiris, Aukštieji Karačiūnai, Antakalnis, Antaviliai, Baniškės, Didieji Pupojai, Dvarčionys, Galgiai, Gvazdikai, Kalnai, Kairėnai, Liepynė, Mažieji Pupojai, Meiriškės, Mileišiškės, Pečiukai, Pylimėliai, Sapieginė, Saulėtekis, Smėlynė, Šilas, Šilėnai, Turniškės, Vaguva, Valakampiai, Aukštoji Veržuva, Žemoji Veržuva, Vinciūniškės, Vismalai, Vismaliukai, Vyriai, Žemieji Karačiūnai.

== Demographics ==
The population of Antakalnis was 39,257 according to the 2021 Lithuanian census, an increase from 38,940 in 2011 and a decrease from 39,697 in 2001.

Population of Antakalnis Eldership as of 2021
Rank	Nationality	Population	
1.	Lithuania	30,867	78.6%
2.	Poland	3,662	9.3%
3.	Russia	2,510	6.4%
4.	Belarus	510	1.3%
5.	Ukraine	209	0.5%
6.	Others	349	0.9%
	Not indicated	1,154	2.9%

== Tourist Attractions ==
- Pavilniai Regional Park
- Antakalnis Park of Benches
- UNO Park Vilnius
- Colorful Springs

== Famous people ==
Famous Lithuanians having lived in Antakalnis eldership:

- Valdas Adamkus, former President of Lithuania
- Mark Antokolski, sculptor
- Algirdas Brazauskas, former president and Prime Minister of Lithuania
- Janina Degutytė, poet
- Vytautas Kernagis, actor and composer
- Andrius Kubilius, former Prime Minister of Lithuania
- Andrius Mamontovas, a rock singer
- Virgilijus Noreika, an opera singer
- Rolandas Paksas, former President of Lithuania
- Paulius Širvys, poet
- Sofija Veiverytė, artist/painter
- Ingrida Šimonytė, former Minister of Finance and Prime Minister of Lithuania
- Jurga Ivanauskaitė, writer
