= Pečiukai =

- City neighborhood
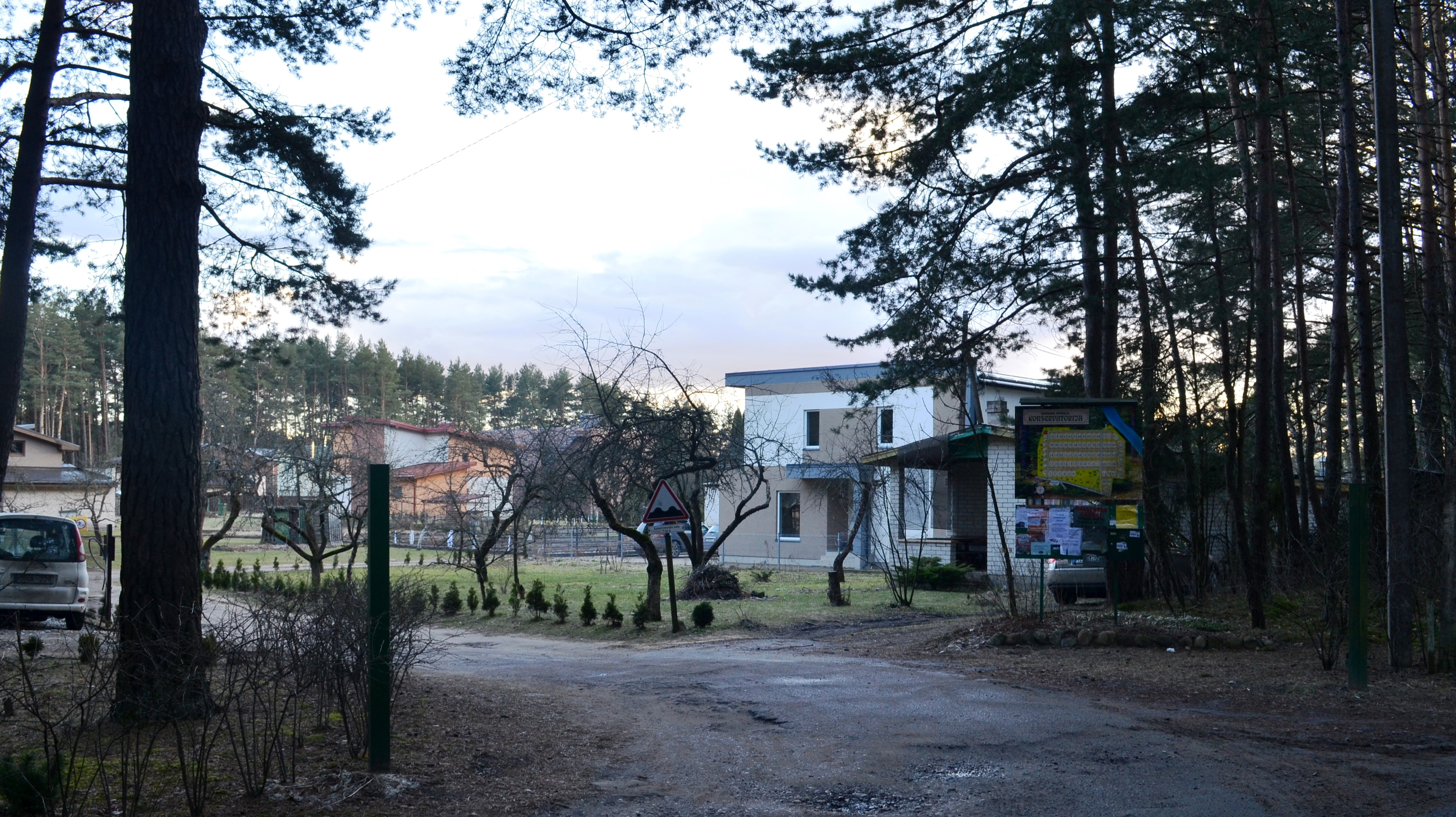
- Entrance to Konservatorijos gardens in Pečiukai

- Location of Pečiukai
- Coordinates: 54°46′55″N 25°22′4″E
- Country: Lithuania
- County: Vilnius County
- Municipality: Vilnius city municipality
- Time zone: UTC+2 (EET)
  - Summer (DST): UTC+3 (EEST)

Pečiukai (Polish: Pieczuki) is a neighborhood of Vilnius located in the Antakalnis Eldership. It is situated northwest of the city center, on the left bank of the Neris river, south of Liepynė.

== History ==
A homestead was located in the present-day Pečiukai. In 1748, a ferry is supposed to have been located in the area.
