= Gediminas's Tower =

Historic tower in Lithuania

Gediminas Castle Tower
- Gedimino pilies bokštas (Lithuanian)
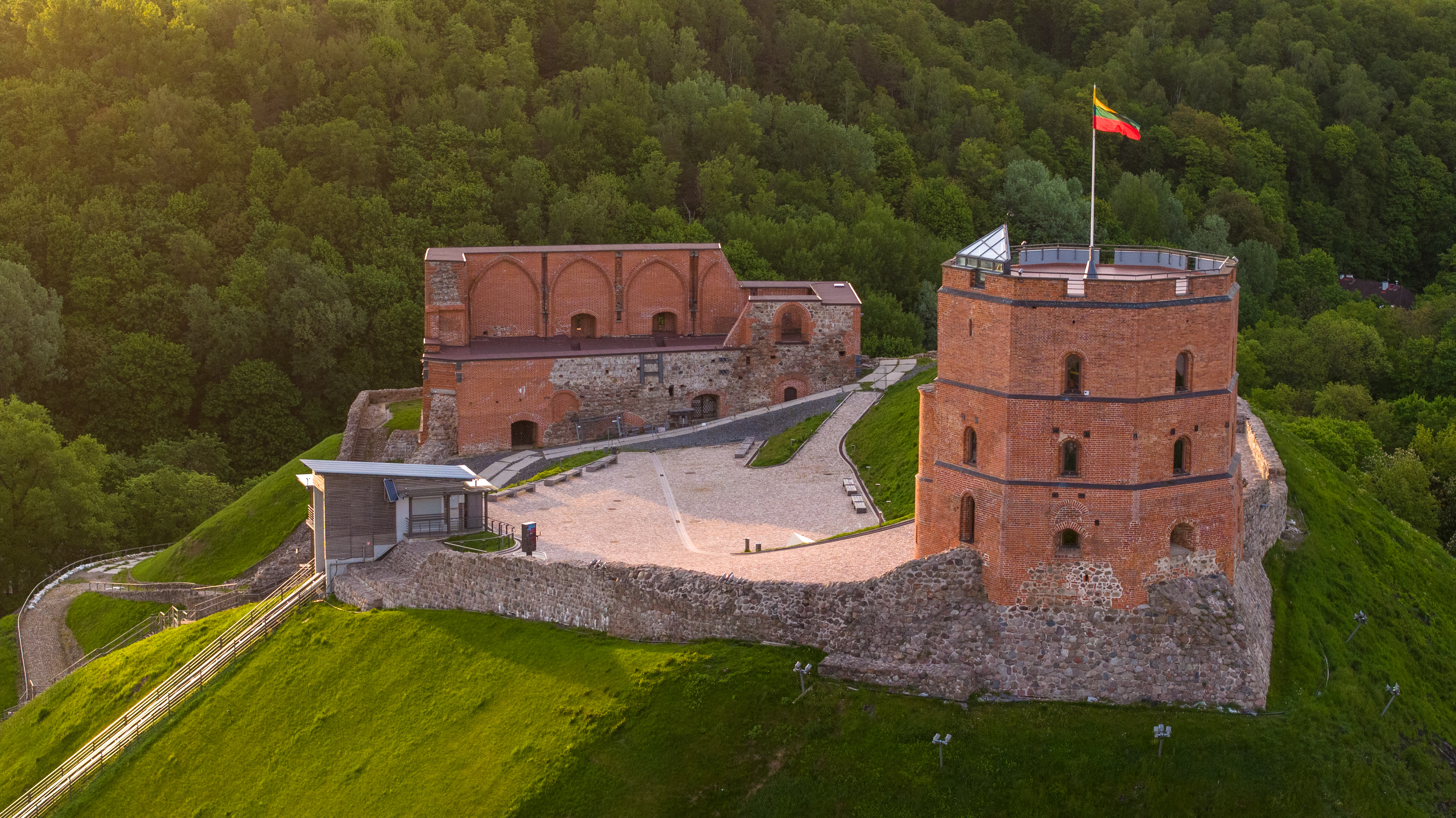
- Aerial view of the tower
- Interactive map of Gediminas Castle Tower
- 54.6867°N 25.2907°E
- Type: Castle tower
- Location: Vilnius, Lithuania

History
- Built: Wooden castle: c. 13th century; Brick castle: 1409; Restored: 1933

Site notes
- Architectural style: Brick gothic

UNESCO World Heritage Site
- Official name: Vilnius Old Town
- Type: Cultural
- Criteria: II, IV
- Designated: 1994 (18th session)
- Reference no.: 541
- Country: Lithuania
- Region: Europe and North America

Cultural Monuments of Lithuania
- Type: National
- Designated: 20 November 2001
- Reference no.: 24709

Gediminas's Tower (Lithuanian: Gedimino pilies bokštas) is the remaining part of the Upper Castle on top of the Gediminas Hill in Vilnius, Lithuania. It has a viewing platform that offers scenic views of Vilnius Old Town and Vilnius Central Business District. Gediminas's Tower is an important state and historic symbol of the city of Vilnius and of Lithuania itself. It was depicted on the former national currency, the litas, and is mentioned in numerous Lithuanian patriotic poems and folk songs.

== History ==
The first wooden fortifications were built by Gediminas, Grand Duke of Lithuania (c. 1275–1341). The first brick castle was completed in 1409 by Grand Duke Vytautas. The three-floor tower was rebuilt in 1933 by Polish architect Jan Borowski. Some remnants of the old castle have been restored, guided by archaeological research.

The hilltop can be reached on foot or by lift. The tower houses a museum exhibiting archaeological findings from the hill and the surrounding areas. This building is three stories tall and is made of decades-old bricks. The museum has models of Vilnius castles from the 14th to the 17th centuries, armament, and iconographic material of the Old Vilnius.

The flag of Lithuania was re-hoisted atop the tower on 7 October 1988, during the independence restoration movement.

A reconstruction of the Royal Palace of Lithuania was completed in 2009, and is located near the base of the hill upon which the tower stands.

== Legend ==
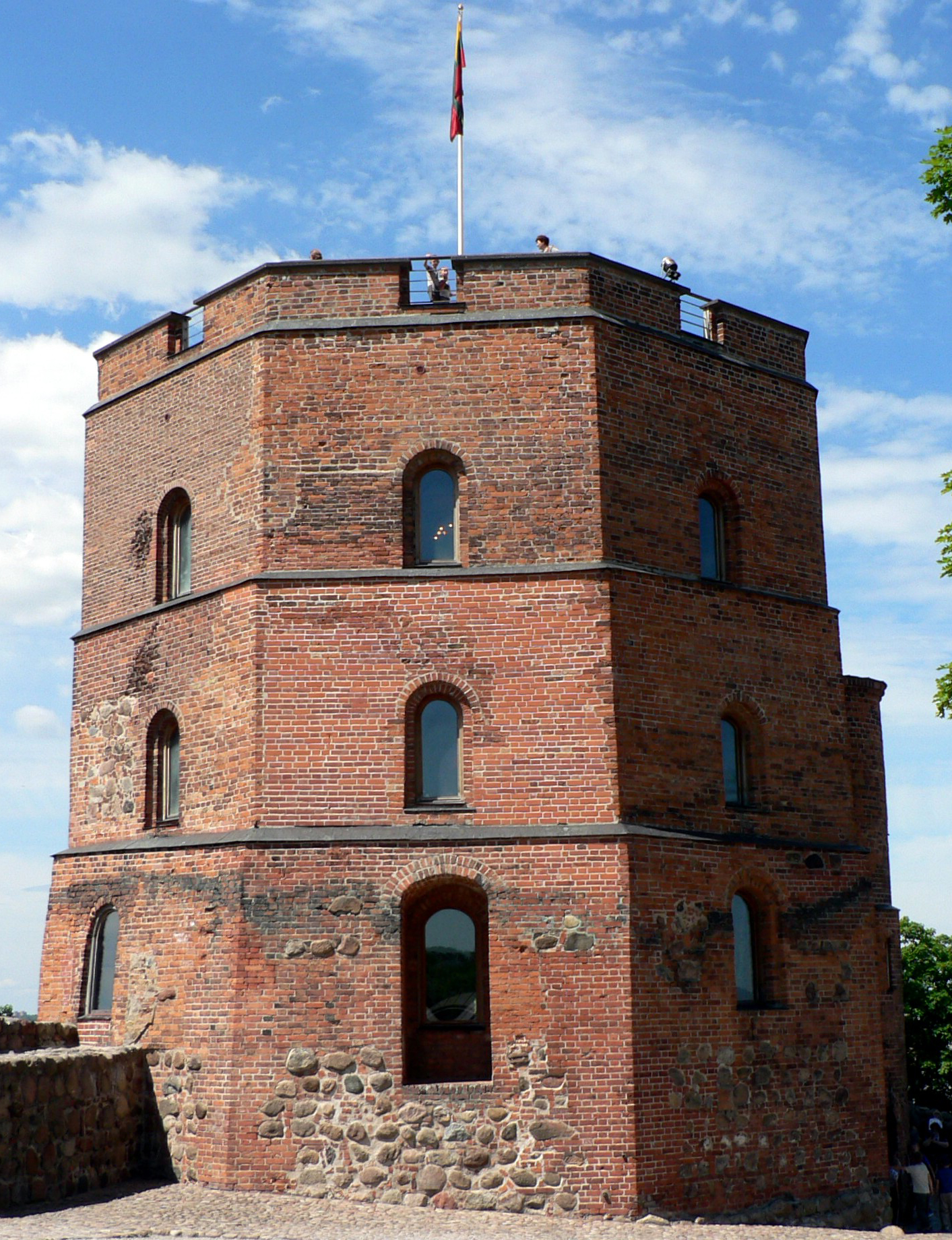
Gediminas's Tower

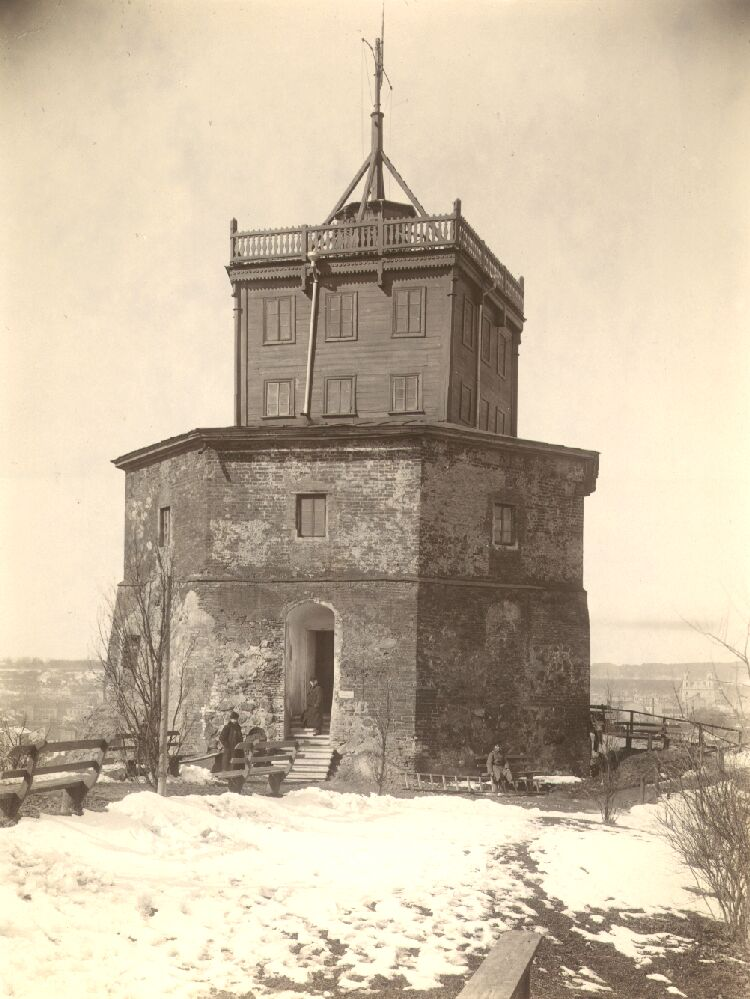
Gediminas's Tower before it was rebuilt in the 1930s

Long ago, the Lithuanian Grand Duke Gediminas was hunting in the woods of Šventaragis Valley. The hunt was successful, and Duke Gediminas brought down a wild bull on a hilltop; but he grew weary in his limbs, and so the duke retired and spent the night there. Now Gediminas had a dream that, up on top of the same hill where he had been hunting that day, stood a great wolf made of iron, and it was howling as loudly as if it were a hundred wolves.

The Duke asked the court magician Lizdeika to explain his dream to him. He interpreted it thus: this was an omen indicating that he should build a city in this place, which would later become known around the world and would become the magnificent capital city of Lithuania.

Gediminas, obeying the will of the gods, began to build the future capital city, and a castle in the centre of it. The city was named Vilnius after the nearby river Vilnia. Gediminas' Tower is the only surviving part of that castle built by Gediminas.

== See also ==
- Three Crosses
- Pilies Street
- Cathedral Square, Vilnius
- Gothic architecture in Lithuania
- Gediminas's Cap
- Vilnius Castle Complex
