= Dvarčionių keramika =

Coordinates: 54°43′44″N 25°22′38″E

- Type: Public
- Founded: 1888
- Defunct: 2016
- Headquarters: Vilnius, Lithuania
- Products: Ceramics
- Number of employees: 150
- Parent: UAB "Misota"
- Website: www.keramika.lt

Dvarčionių keramika was a ceramics tile producer in Lithuania and the largest ceramics producer in the Baltic states. It used to be traded on the NASDAQ OMX Vilnius exchange. The company went bankrupt in 2016.

The company traces its history from a brickyard founded in 1888 in Dvarčionys. It was reconstructed in 1974, to a modern ceramics title producer. Opoczno, the largest ceramics manufacturer in Poland, bought 60.25% of the company in March 2005 for 11.5 million litas and additional 19% in January 2008, for 7.12 million litas. However, Lithuanian UAB Misota took the controlling stake in July 2009. In 2010, the company reported losses, and declining revenue.
