= Antokolsky =

Antokolsky (spelling variations: Antokolskiy, Antokolski) (Russian: Антокольский), feminine: Antokolskaya is a Russian surname. It derives from the Polish form Antokol of the Lithuanian toponym Antakalnis, now an eldership of Vilnius, Lithuania. The notable bearers of this surname were:

- Mark Antokolski (1843–1902), Russian sculptor
- Pavel Antokolsky (1896–1978), Russian poet
