= Sapieginė =

- City neighborhood
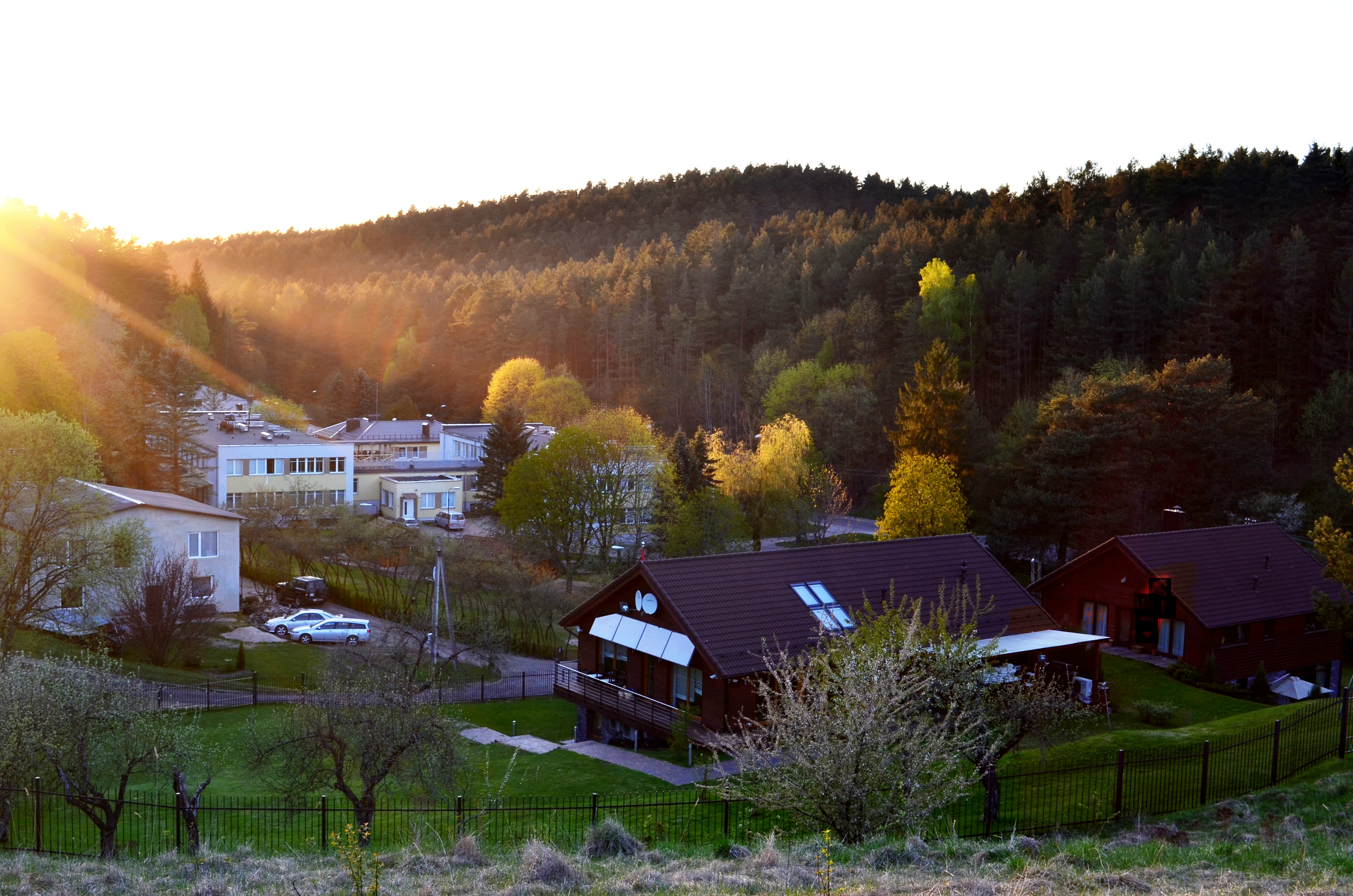
- Žolyno street

- Location of Sapieginė
- Coordinates: 54°42′25″N 25°20′06″E
- Country: Lithuania
- County: Vilnius County
- Municipality: Vilnius city municipality
- Eldership: Antakalnis Eldership
- Time zone: UTC+2 (EET)
  - Summer (DST): UTC+3 (EEST)

Sapieginė is a neighborhood of Vilnius located in the Antakalnis Eldership. It is completely within the territory of Pavilniai Regional Park.

The area houses Interwar Polish ammunition bunkers with one of the largest bat wintering spots in southeast Lithuania. The National Blood Center is also located here.

The eastern part of Sapieginė is located within erosion gullies of Pavilniai Regional Park.

== History ==
Since the 16th century, it belonged to the Sapieha noble family.
