= Gediminas Hill Lift =

Inclined lift in Vilnius, Lithuania

Coordinates: 54°41′14″N 25°17′27″E

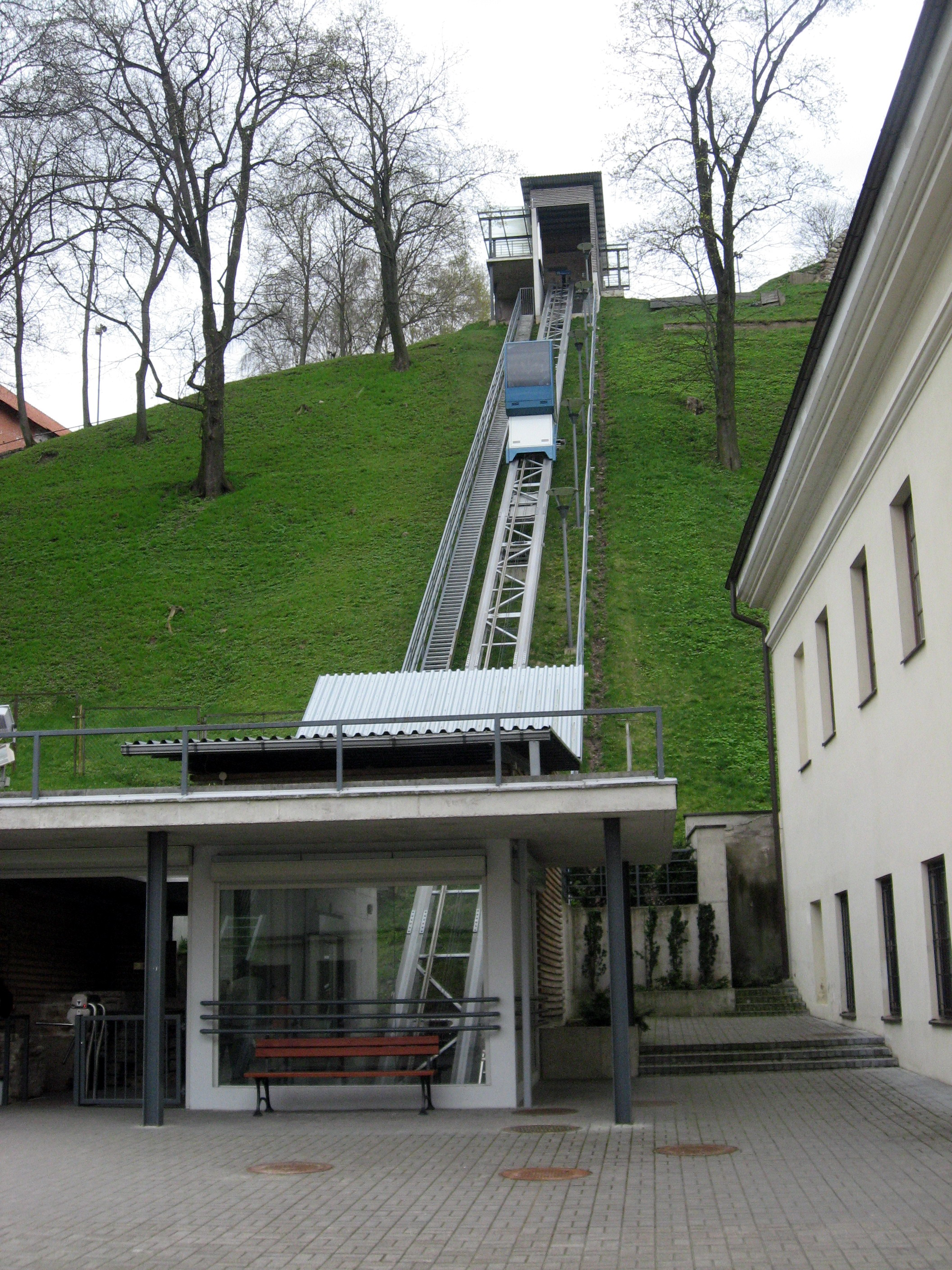

Overview
- Status: In service
- Locale: Vilnius
- Stations: 2
- Website: http://www.lnm.lt/darbo-laikas/

Service
- Type: Inclined elevator
- Services: 1
- Operator(s): Vilniaus pilių valstybinio kultūrinio rezervato direkcija
- Rolling stock: 1 ABS Transportbahnen (Doppelmayr Garaventa Group)

History
- Opened: 2003

Technical
- Line length: 65 m (213 ft)
- Number of tracks: 1
- Character: 1
- Track gauge: 1,200 mm (3 ft 11 1/4 in)
- Operating speed: 2 m/s (4.5 mph)

Gediminas Hill Lift (Lithuanian: Keltuvas į Gedimino kalną) is an inclined lift in up the slope of the Gediminas Hill, Vilnius, Lithuania. Opened in 2003, it is used by visitors to reach the Upper Castle and Gediminas Tower.

== Description ==
The lift was built by ABS Transportbahnen (Doppelmayr Garaventa Group). The system is operated by Vilniaus pilių direkcija.

The main characteristics of the lift are as follows:

- Length: 65 metres (213 ft)
- Difference in level: 39 m (128 ft)
- Inclination: 37°
- Track gauge: 1,200 mm (47.2 ft)
- Travel speed: 2 m/s (6.56 ft/s)
- Cabin capacity: 16 passengers

The lift is powered by electricity. The time of one ride is 1 minute.
