= Dvarčionys =

- City neighborhood
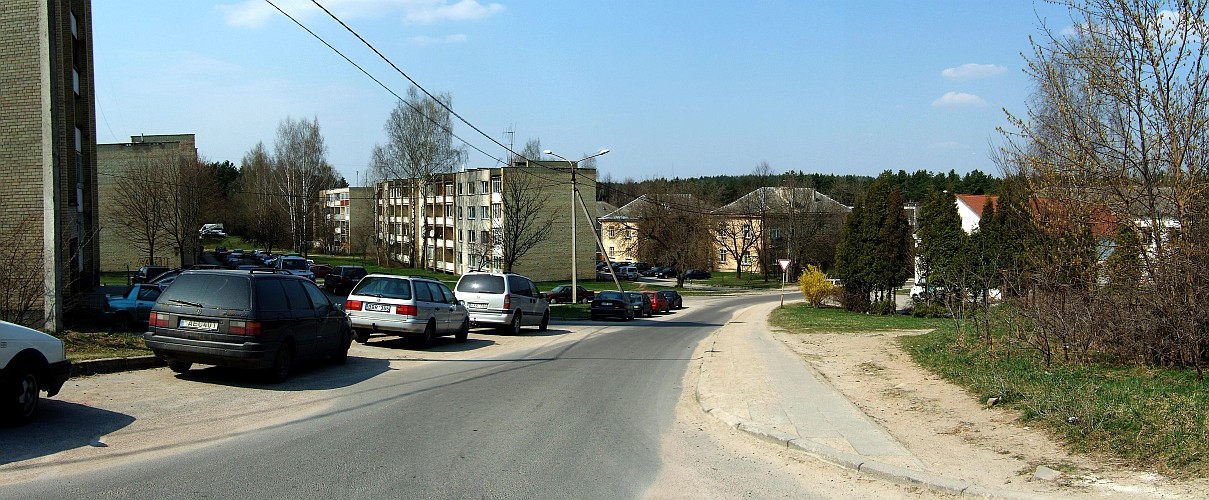
- Dvarčionys street in 2011

- Location of Dvarčionys
- Coordinates: 54°43′40″N 25°22′10″E
- Country: Lithuania
- County: Vilnius County
- Municipality: Vilnius city municipality
- Time zone: UTC+2 (EET)
  - Summer (DST): UTC+3 (EEST)

Dvarčionys is a neighborhood of Vilnius located in the Antakalnis Eldership, 7 kilometers from the city center. Dvarčia stream flows through the area, which is surrounded by forests from all sides.

The area is home to the largest ceramics tile producer in the Baltic states, AB Dvarčionių keramika.

== History ==
During the Soviet occupation, Dvarčionys was a ceramics factory worker settlement. It was incorporated into Vilnius city in 1959.
