= Kazimieras Vasiliauskas (monsignor) =

Lithuanian Catholic priest (1922–2001)

Monsignor Kazimieras Vasiliauskas
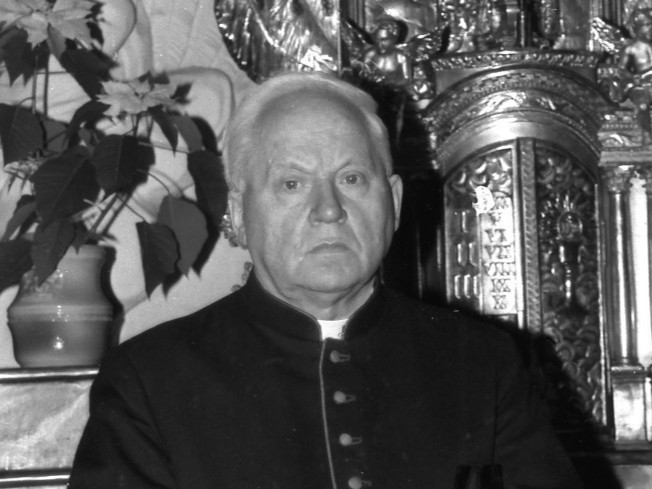
- Vasiliauskas in 1992

Personal life
- Born: April 9, 1922 Kateliškiai, Lithuania
- Died: October 14, 2001 (aged 79) Vilnius, Lithuania
- Resting place: Antakalnis Cemetery
- Education: Vilnius Seminary

Religious life
- Religion: Catholic Church
- Ordination: June 16, 1946

Kazimieras Vasiliauskas (April 9, 1922 – October 14, 2001) was a Lithuanian Catholic priest and monsignor who emerged as one of the most prominent clergy members of the Lithuanian Catholic Church in the latter half of the 20th century. Renowned for his unwavering resistance to Soviet occupation, he was a staunch defender of religious and civil rights, as well as an advocate for tolerance, compassion, and humanism. Throughout his life, he was known to promote principles of forgiveness and reconciliation.

== Early life ==
Kazimieras Vasiliauskas was born on April 9, 1922, in the village of Kateliškiai, near Vabalninkas, in Biržai County, to a farm family, the youngest of three children. His parents were Juozas Vasiliauskas (1874–1961) and Valerija (née Baniulytė) Vasiliauskienė (1897–1984). Raised in a devout Catholic family, he attended Čypėnai Elementary School before enrolling in Biržai Gymnasium, where he developed a love for literature and poetry. He frequently participated in student literary evenings, reciting the works of his favorite poets. As a teenager, he became an active member and leader of Ateitininkai, a Catholic youth organization dedicated to fostering faith and civic responsibility among young people in Lithuania.

In 1940, following the Soviet Union's occupation of Lithuania, 19-year-old Vasiliauskas soon came face to face with the policies of the new regime. The Soviet authorities outlawed all organizations, including Ateitininkai. As a prominent leader within this now-illegal organization, Vasiliauskas discovered that he had been placed on an NKVD arrest list. In the spring of 1941, Vasiliauskas and several gymnasium friends attempted to cross the border into East Prussia, Germany. However, after crossing they were detained by the German authorities and transferred to the Soldau concentration camp, where they were held for three months.

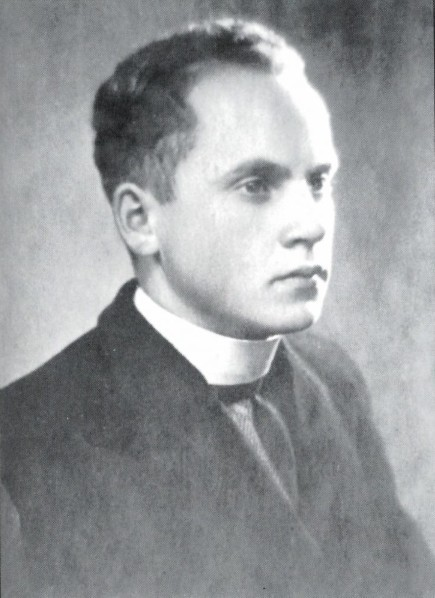
Father Vasiliauskas, 1946

At Soldau, Vasiliauskas experienced the brutality of German guards, witnessed Jewish prisoners being led to execution, as well as the torture of Polish priests. For him, the Nazi concentration camp experience was a prelude to his future deportation to Siberia by Soviet authorities. During his incarceration, Nazi Germany attacked the Soviet Union on June 22, 1941, occupying Lithuania in a matter of days. Upon his release from Soldau, Vasiliauskas stayed briefly in the Prussian city of Königsberg, taking odd jobs to support himself. In September 1941, he decided to return to Lithuania and pursue his calling to become a priest.

He entered the Kaunas Priest Seminary in 1941 and transferred to the Vilnius Seminary in 1942. He was ordained a priest on June 16, 1946, by Archbishop Mečislovas Reinys of Vilnius. By this point Lithuania was once again occupied by the Soviet Union, which pursued a policy of repression for all religious institutions. While the Soviet authorities did not outlaw all religious activities, they were severely curtailed and monitored.

== Early ministry ==
It was in this context that in 1946, Vasiliauskas began his priesthood by serving as a vicar in Kalesninkai, Švenčionys, as well as the parish of St. Teresa and the Chapel of the Gates of Dawn in Vilnius. During this period, he joined the secret self-education society College of the Virgin Mary of the Gates of Dawn, which was dedicated to theological and philosophical studies. In 1948, he was reassigned as the administrator of Rimšė parish in the Zarasai district.

== Arrest and exile ==
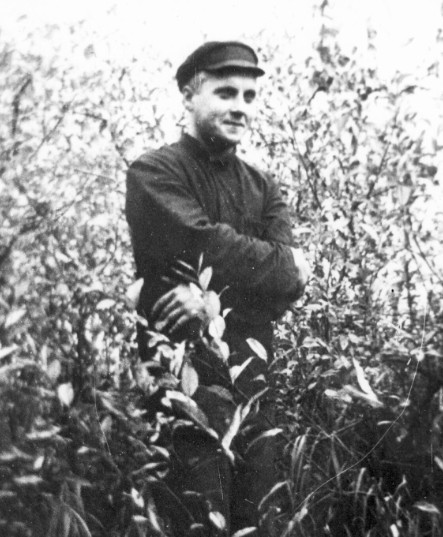
Father Vasiliauskas in exile, Inta (Komi), c. 1955

Armed anti-Soviet resistance in Lithuania began at the end of World War II in 1944 and lasted until 1953. In 1949, Vasiliauskas was arrested by Soviet authorities on charges of anti-Soviet activities. Accused of aiding partisans and refusing to report their activities to Soviet officials, he was sentenced to 10 years of forced labor in Siberia. He was sent to coal mines in Inta and Vorkuta, Komi ASSR, where he endured harsh physical labor and dire living conditions. Despite these circumstances, he secretly celebrated Mass, heard confessions, and provided spiritual support to fellow prisoners.

After his release in 1958, he was prohibited from returning to Lithuania and spent nearly a decade in Latvia, where he worked as a loader, electrician, and accountant. His parents were deported to Siberia in 1949 as part of Soviet policies aimed at eradicating well-to-do farmers. Their property was confiscated. They were released in 1956 and returned to Lithuania.

== Return to Lithuania ==
In 1968, Vasiliauskas was permitted to return to Lithuania, where he was appointed parish priest in Varėna. He served there until 1975 before being assigned as vicar adjutor at the Church of St. Raphael the Archangel in Vilnius.

During the post-war years, I graduated from the seminary and served as a priest for three years. At that time, many priests were arrested, and the main motive for the repressions against the clergy was the government’s desire to quickly turn our compatriots into atheists.

Therefore, the authorities sought to isolate the more energetic and active priests from society. All the official accusations were very insignificant. For example, I was accused of allegedly seeing partisans but not reporting it to the security services. But during the post-war years, there wasn’t a single person in Lithuania who hadn’t seen a partisan. In reality, they could have imprisoned the entire nation for that.

They targeted those who posed a greater obstacle to spreading their atheistic propaganda and isolated them. And for this, I had to spend ten years in a prison in Komi." — Father K. Vasiliauskas, Kryžkelė, March 1994

He signed multiple protests and appeals to Soviet authorities, defending the rights of the Church and opposing restrictions on religious freedom. Notable actions included:

- Defending bishops Vincentas Sladkevičius and Julijonas Steponavičius (1971–1972).
- Advocating for the publication of religious literature.
- Protesting against restrictions on believers' rights and government interference in Church affairs (1977).
- Condemning the arrests of priests Alfonsas Svarinskas and Sigitas Tamkevičius (1983).

He maintained ties with members of the Lithuanian Helsinki Group, providing moral and spiritual support to anti-Soviet dissidents. During the 1975 trial of dissident Sergei Kovalyov in Vilnius, human rights activist Andrei Sakharov stayed at Vasiliauskas' home.

== Later years ==
In 1989, during Lithuania's independence movement, Vasiliauskas was appointed the first parish priest of the restored Vilnius Cathedral. That same year, Pope John Paul II conferred upon him the title of monsignor. From 1993 to 1995, he served as rector of the Vilnius Seminary. In 1997, he retired from his role at Vilnius Cathedral and became an emeritus priest at St. Nicholas Church in Vilnius. From 1990 to 2000, Monsignor Vasiliauskas actively supported Lithuanian diaspora communities, visiting the United States, Canada, and Russia to provide spiritual guidance and promote cultural unity.

Despite facing health challenges, he remained actively engaged in public life and was widely admired for his kindness and inclusivity. During this period, his interpretation of Christianity, where he emphasized tolerance toward others and the necessity for forgiveness, became more publicly evident and widely recognized. Monsignor Vasiliauskas was often regarded as the "conscience of the Lithuanian nation."

Kazimieras Vasiliauskas died on October 14, 2001, in Vilnius. He was buried at Antakalnis Cemetery, on the Hill of Artists. His gravestone features the words of his favorite poet, Jurgis Baltrušaitis: "There is light even in darkness."

== Legacy ==
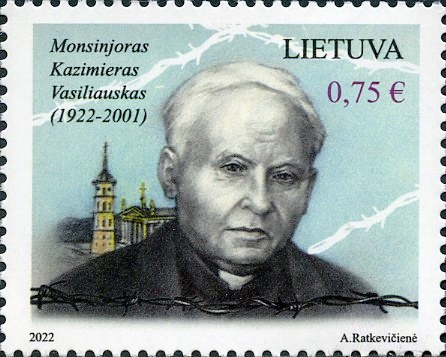
Monsignor Vasiliauskas centenary, 2022

Kazimieras Vasiliauskas' life and contributions are commemorated through various monuments in Vilnius and Vabalninkas, as well as exhibitions, books and documentaries that highlight his enduring legacy. In 2009, his name was inscribed on a Tree of Unity, a sculpture by Tadas Gutauskas, recognizing him as one of Lithuania's 100 most prominent personalities. To honor his centenary in 2022, Lithuania issued in a commemorative postage stamp in his memory. During his lifetime, Kazimieras Vasiliauskas received numerous awards, including:

- The Officer’s Cross of the Order of the Lithuanian Grand Duke Gediminas (1994)
- The Santarvė Foundation Award for his tolerance and compassion (1995)
- The St. Christopher Statuette and the "Vilniaus garsas" Award (1996)
- The title of Honorary Citizen of Vilnius (2000)
- The Lithuanian Independence Medal (2000)

== Quotes ==
- "Monsignor Kazimieras did not turn away anyone. He befriended both tax collectors and Pharisees, those who had lost their faith and those searching for it." — Cardinal Audrys Juozas Bačkis
- "He quelled vengeance and hatred, helping everyone to rise and unite." — Poet Justinas Marcinkevičius
- "A priest who taught the patience of life and faith as the greatest wisdom." — Academician Viktorija Daujotytė
