= Sapieha Madonna =

Lithuanian painting of the Virgin Mary

- Sapiegų Madona (Lithuanian)
- The Sapieha Madonna with restored golden papal crowns
- Artist: Unknown
- Year: The painting was originally painted in the late 15th – 16th century, and repainted in the early 17th century
- Type: Icon
- Medium: Tempera on canvas
- Subject: Blessed Virgin Mary, Jesus, saints Francis of Assisi, Bernardino of Siena
- Dimensions: Height: over 200 cm (over 79 in)
- Condition: On display
- Location: Goštautai Chapel within Vilnius Archcathedral, Vilnius; 54°41′09″N 25°17′16″E
- Owner: Archdiocese of Vilnius

The Sapieha Madonna (Lithuanian: Sapiegų Madona), also known as the Blessed Virgin Mary, venerated by St. Francis of Assisi and St. Bernardino of Siena (Lithuanian: Švč. Mergelė Marija, garbinama šv. Pranciškaus Asyžiečio ir šv. Bernardino Sieniečio) is a prominent Catholic Church icon of Mary, mother of Jesus, holding in her hands Jesus, as well as saints Francis of Assisi and Bernardino of Siena venerating her standing nearby.

It was originally painted by an unknown painter in the late 15th – 16th century, but was damaged by fire in 1610 and was repainted by an unknown painter in the early 17th century. The painting is of Baroque style. It is currently on display on the southern wall of the Goštautai Chapel within Vilnius Archcathedral in Vilnius, Lithuania.

== History ==
The painting initially belonged to the Bernardines Church of St. Francis and St. Bernardino in Vilnius and was painted in the late 15th – 16th century. However, in the late 16th century Lew Sapieha, a Grand Chancellor of Lithuania, commissioned a new Church of St. Michael in Vilnius and Poor Clares Monastery. The new religious complex was intended to serve as the Sapieha family's mausoleum and under the direction of Lew Sapieha the painting was moved to the High Altar of Church of St. Michael. Since then this painting also bear the name of Sapieha family. Historically the current painting was only the centerpiece of a triptych as two side paintings of Saint Peter and Saint Paul were attached to it.

During the Battle of Vilnius in 1655 the Army of the Tsardom of Russia devastated Vilnius and the Church of St. Michael was set on fire, which caused a burning beam fall on the triptych. According to historical sources, at the time the triptych's centerpiece (current painting) was only slightly damaged (the face of the Blessed Virgin Mary slightly turned black), while the triptych's side paintings of Saint Peter and Saint Paul were severely damaged and fell down. The survival of the triptych's centerpiece was considered as miraculous event and once Vilnius was liberated from the Russian Army in 1661 and the Church of St. Michael was restored the painting's veneration further increased. By performing the post-war restoration of the painting in the early 17th century, the saints Francis of Assisi and Bernardino of Siena were painted in the sides near the Blessed Virgin Mary with Jesus.

Proceedings for the coronation of the painting have been initiated in 1733. Through the efforts of Duke Jan Fryderyk Sapieha, a Grand Chancellor of Lithuania and Castellan of Trakai, Pope Benedict XIV consecrated and sent from Rome papal crowns for the painting and following a few days festivities the painting on September 8, 1750 was crowned with the papal crowns by Michał Jan Zienkowicz, Bishop of Vilnius. It is the first and the oldest surviving image in Vilnius crowned with papal crowns. The Lithuanian nobles also donated precious stones for the decoration of the painting: Lithuanian Grand Hetman Paweł Jan Sapieha, Lithuanian Grand Hetman Michał Kazimierz Pac, Lithuanian Grand Marshall Aleksander Hilary Połubiński, Teodora Sapieha-Naruševičienė, etc. The painting previously also had a silver vestment decorated with precious stones.

The painting was located in the Church of St. Michael until the end of World War II, however following its closure by the Soviets in 1949-1950 the painting was moved to the Courtyard of the Monastery of Holy Spirit in Vilnius. In 1973, the painting was rolled up, moved to the attic of Vilnius Archcathedral (at the time the Gallery of Images) and hidden, where it was later rediscovered and restored. Nevertheless, the painting's historic sumptuous papal crowns, silver cloth and some other valuable decorations gone during the Soviet period in ~1960 until it was moved to Vilnius Archcathedral.

In 1989, the painting was placed in the Goštautai Chapel of Vilnius Archcathedral under the direction of Julijonas Steponavičius, an Apostolic Administrator of Vilnius and later Archbishop of Vilnius.

Under the initiative of the Vilnius Archcathedral's parish priest Virginijus Česnulevičius, during the Advent season, the collection of gold was initiated for the restoration of the historic painting's papal crowns. In total 840 parishioners donated gold for this matter (e.g. wedding rings) and on September 8, 2020 the painting was again crowned with restored papal crowns (exactly 270 years after its initial crowning).

In the Vilnius Archcathedral it is the second most renowned painting for graces (after the Three-Handed Saint Casimir) and near it in the chapel two large boards with many votive offerings are placed on the wall.

== See also ==
- Our Lady of the Gate of Dawn
- Our Lady of Šiluva
