= Three-Handed Saint Casimir =

Lithuanian painting of Saint Casimir

- Trirankis Šventasis Kazimieras (Lithuanian)
- The painting without its later silver revetment
- Artist: Unknown
- Year: First half of the 16th century (traditionally c. 1520)
- Type: Devotional painting
- Medium: Tempera on oak panels
- Subject: Saint Casimir
- Dimensions: 75 cm × 46 cm (30 in × 18 in)
- Condition: On display
- Location: Chapel of Saint Casimir, Vilnius Cathedral, Vilnius; 54°41′08.6″N 25°17′17.7″E
- Owner: Archdiocese of Vilnius

The Three-Handed Saint Casimir (Lithuanian: Trirankis Šventasis Kazimieras) is a 16th-century tempera painting depicting Saint Casimir, a Polish–Lithuanian prince and the patron saint of Lithuania. It is venerated in the Chapel of Saint Casimir in Vilnius Cathedral, where it hangs below the saint's sarcophagus. Traditionally regarded as a miraculous image and known for granting graces, it is among the most venerated paintings in the cathedral, alongside the Sapieha Madonna.

== Description ==
The painting, attributed to an unknown artist, is traditionally dated to around 1520, although a somewhat later date in the first half of the 16th century has also been proposed. Executed in tempera on oak panels, it measures 75 × 46 centimetres (30 × 18 in) and is considered the oldest surviving painted depiction of Saint Casimir. Historical sources refer to it as Venerabilis Icon ("Venerable Image").

An earlier depiction of Saint Casimir appears in a woodcut illustrating a biography of the prince written by Zacharias Ferreri and published in Kraków in 1521. The two images share several iconographic features, including the saint's fur-trimmed mantle, princely headgear and lily. Unlike the painting, however, the woodcut depicts the saint with only two hands. The woodcut may have served as a model for the painting, although the latter's precise date and origins remain uncertain. An even earlier depiction of Saint Casimir may be known from a copy dating to the first half of the 19th century, preserved in the parish church in Krosno. The painting bears the date 1520, while the coats of arms superimposed on the image are Renaissance in form. The prince is depicted in a manner similar to the Vilnius painting, although he holds a palm branch rather than a lily.

The painting underwent restoration in 1594, as indicated by an inscription on the work itself. Subsequent technical examinations revealed that the saint's face and all three hands belong to the original composition and were not added during later restorations. Exhibited in the Chapel of Saint Casimir in Vilnius Cathedral the painting is partially covered by an elaborate silver riza (revetment), produced before 1743. The metal covering follows the composition of the original painting while leaving the saint's face, hands and certain other details visible.

== Symbolism ==
=== Third hand ===
The painting's most distinctive feature is its depiction of Saint Casimir with three hands, including two right hands, each holding a sprig of lilies. According to a legend recorded in the 17th century, the artist originally depicted the saint with his right arm outstretched. Wishing to alter the composition, he attempted to conceal the original hand beneath a thick layer of paint and painted a second right hand pointing towards the saint's chest. However, the first hand allegedly continued to reappear through the paint. This was interpreted as a miracle, and both right hands were ultimately left visible. The unusual feature came to symbolise Saint Casimir's generosity and concern for the poor. Technical examinations have since established that both right hands were painted at the same time and that neither was subsequently painted over. The original intention behind this unusual representation therefore remains uncertain.

The lilies held in the saint's right hands are traditional Christian symbols of purity, innocence and chastity. Their repetition has also been interpreted as an expression of the abundance of divine grace associated with Saint Casimir's intercession. Historian Mathias Niendorf offered an alternative interpretation, suggesting that the additional outstretched hand might belong to an otherwise invisible figure standing behind the saint.

=== Other elements ===
Saint Casimir is depicted wearing a red, fur-lined robe and a princely crown, reflecting his royal descent as the son of Casimir IV Jagiellon, King of Poland and Grand Duke of Lithuania. The coats of arms of the Kingdom of Poland and the Grand Duchy of Lithuania appear in the upper corners of the composition, emphasising his Jagiellonian heritage. The saint also wears the Order of the Golden Fleece on his chest, although he was never awarded the decoration during his lifetime. The order was, however, conferred upon several members of his family, including his brother Sigismund I the Old, who received it in 1519, as well as Sigismund III Vasa and Władysław IV Vasa.

X-ray examinations have revealed that the Order of the Golden Fleece was not part of the original composition. In its place, the painting initially featured a medallion depicting the Virgin Mary and the Christ Child. According to art historian Sigita Maslauskaitė, the medallion was probably replaced by the order during the reign of the Vasa dynasty, whose members promoted the cult of Saint Casimir and were themselves recipients of the decoration.

In his left hand, Saint Casimir holds a rosary, symbolising his devotion to the Virgin Mary. In later artistic representations, the rosary was often replaced by a cross.

An inscription in the left corner of the painting contains a passage from Psalm 92:12, followed by the date of its restoration:

IUSTUS UT PALMA FLOREBIT, SICUT CEDRUM LIBANI MULTIPLICABITUR 1594 RENOVATUM

The inscription translates as "The righteous shall flourish like a palm tree and grow like a cedar of Lebanon; restored in 1594." The biblical passage has been associated with the veneration of Saint Casimir since the 16th century and is used in liturgical celebrations dedicated to the saint.

== Gallery ==
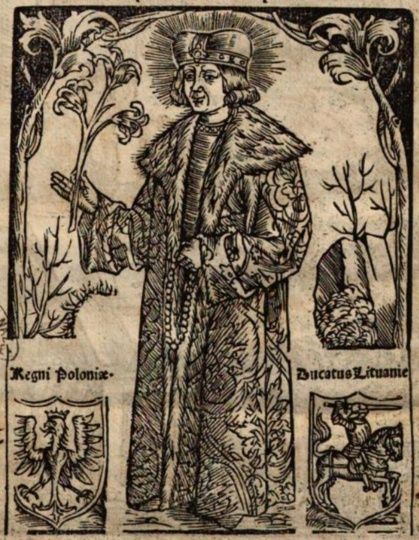
Woodcut of Saint Casimir, Vita beati Casimiri by Zacharia Ferreri, 1521.

The painting covered with silver vestment

People praying in front of the painting and sarcophagus of St. Casimir in 1901

Baptism ceremony in front of the painting in 2012

== See also ==
- Our Lady of the Gate of Dawn
- Our Lady of Šiluva

== Bibliography ==
- Samek, Jan (1984). "Refleksy kultu św. Kazimierza w sztuce. Zarys problemów" [Reflections of the Cult of Saint Casimir in Art: An Outline of the Issues] (PDF). Analecta Cracoviensia (in Polish). 16: 139–151. doi:10.15633/acr.3171.
