= Tommaso Righi =

Italian sculptor

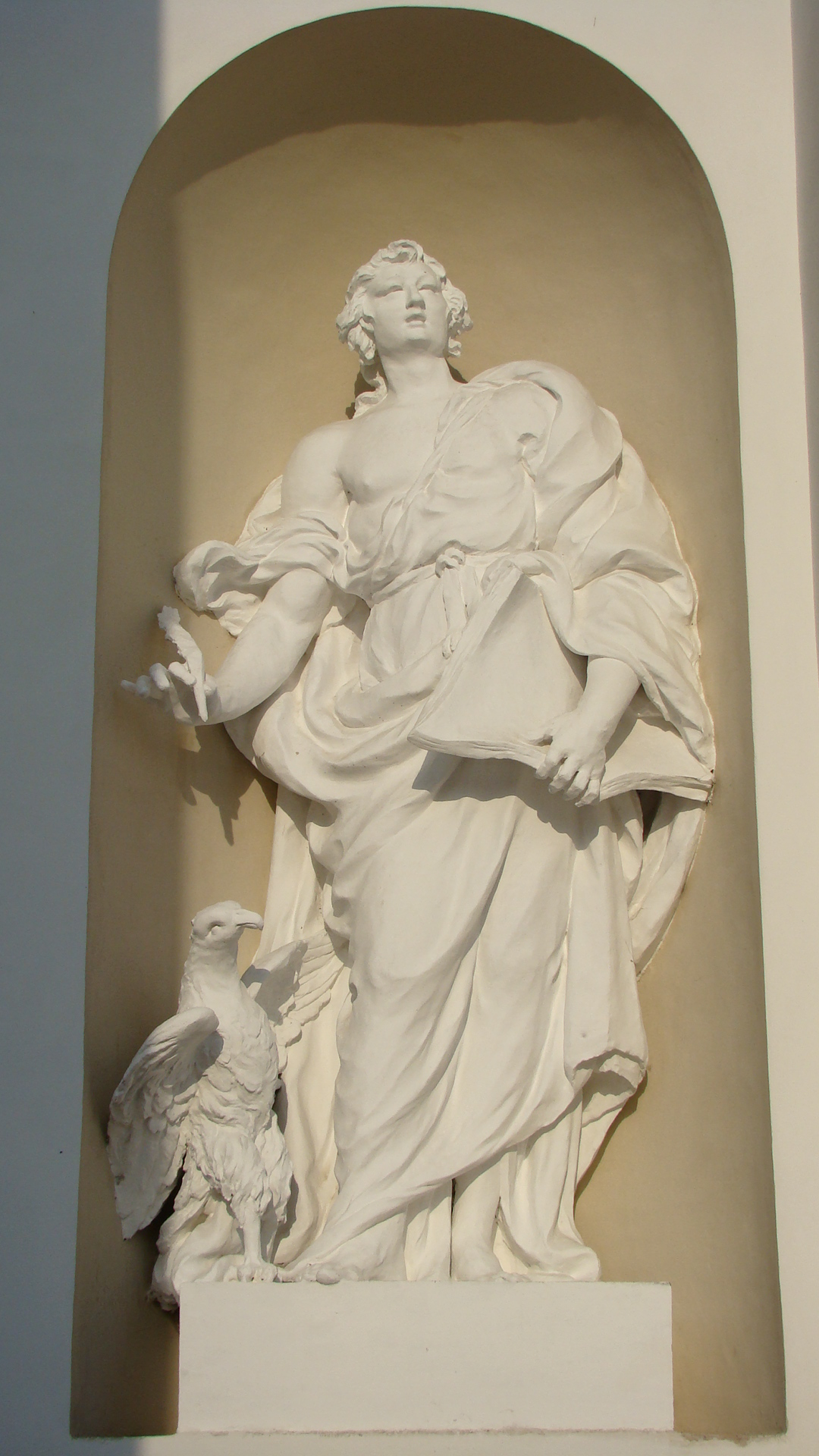
Apostle John sculpture on the Vilnius Cathedral facade

Tommaso Righi (1727–1802) was an Italian sculptor and stuccator with a practice in Rome. His marble and stucco funeral monument to Carlo Pio Balestra (died 1776), patron of the Church of Santi Luca e Martina, in the Roman Forum, is probably his most prominent commission. His monument of cardinal Camillo Paolucci (died 1763) stands in a chapel of San Marcello al Corso, where its design was constrained by its having to form a pendant to the baroque monument facing it, of Fabrizio Paolucci, by Pietro Bracci (1726). A great work, less often seen, is his altarpiece in the Church of S. Maria del Priorato, the chapel of the Villa of the Sovereign Military Order of Malta: Piranesi provided the design, and Righi executed the great globe surrounded by putti in clouds, and Saint Basil in Glory supported by two angels. His bas-relief panel appears among a host by others, in the central Sala degli Imperatori of the Galleria Borghese, part of the rearrangement of the interiors of the Villa Borghese undertaken in 1782 by prince Marcantonio Borghese.

In Vilnius the main facade of the rigorously neoclassical Vilnius Cathedral is adorned with sculptures of the Four Evangelists by Righi.

One of his pupils was Giuseppe Ceracchi, sculptor of a portrait of George Washington and passionate republican.
