= Albert Żamett =

Polish–Russian landscapes painter

- Born: 25 November 1821; Vilnius
- Died: 1876 (aged 54–55)
- Education: Member Academy of Arts (1859)
- Alma mater: Imperial Academy of Arts
- Occupation: Landscape Painter

Albert Żamett (25 November 1821 – 1876) was a Polish–Russian landscapes painter.

His father Daniel Schamett moved from East Prussia to Vilnius, where he became a Russian citizen. Albert Żamett attended a gymnasium in Vilnius. He studied at the Academy of Fine Arts in St. Petersburg as a free listener under Maxim Vorobiev. In 1847, with the support of Kaunas Marshal Benedict Tyszkiewicz, he went to Italy and then to France, England and Germany.

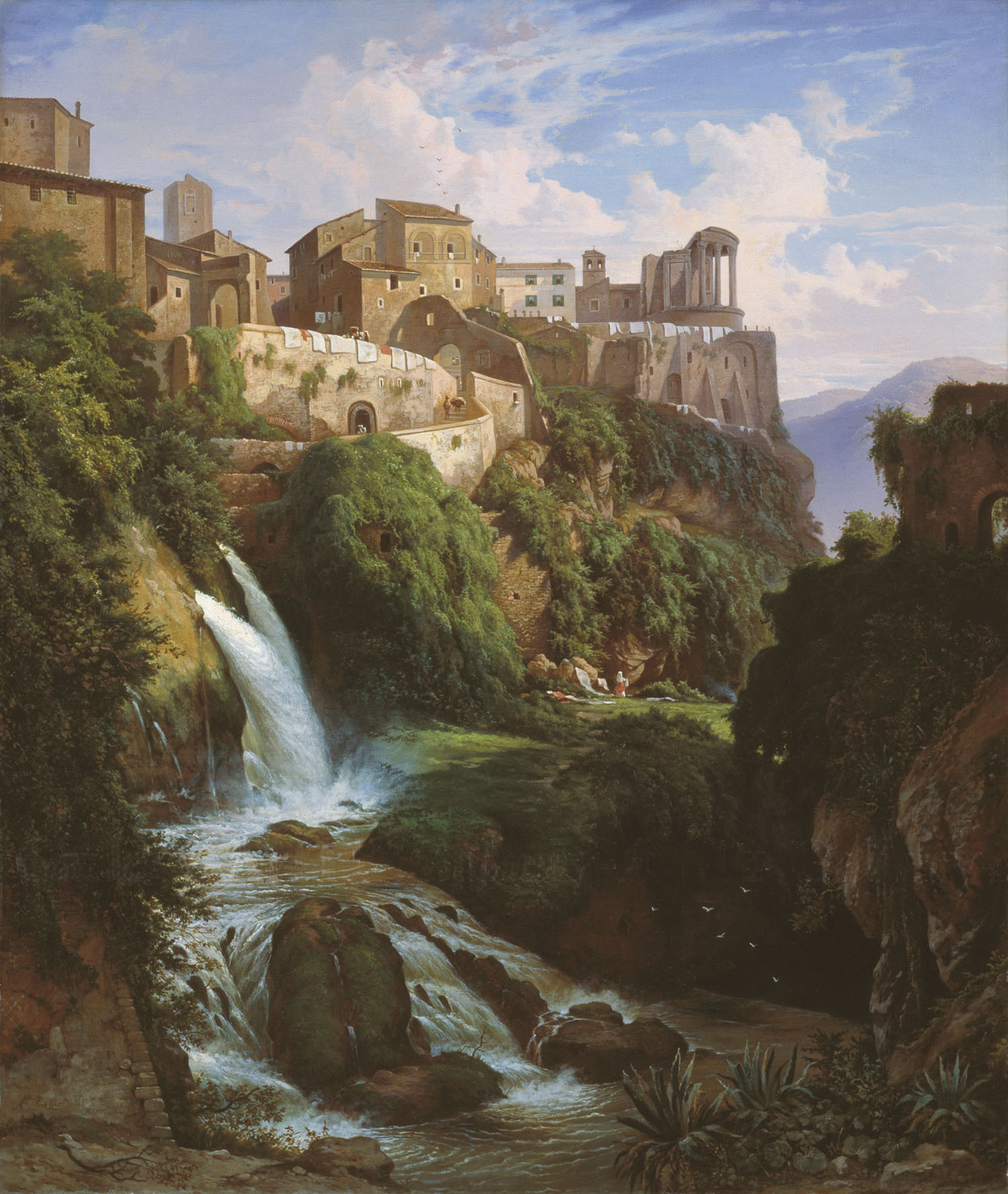
View of Cascade and Temple of Sybilli in Tivoli, 1855

In 1854, he was awarded a prize in the Roman Academy of St. Luke for the landscape painting. In 1859, he received the title of academic, among others, for the landscape of the Rocca di Papa area.

In 1861–1863, he resumed his stay in France, England and Savoy. In 1864 he returned to Vilnius, where he was responsible for the scenery of the Municipal Theater. He made frescos in the vestibule of the Cathedral of Vilnius.

== Literature ==
- В. Г. Жамет, Альберт Данилович // Русский биографический словарь: в 25-ти томах. - СПб.М., 1896-1918
- Art Gallery (russia)
