= Vilnius Cathedral =

Catholic cathedral in Lithuania

- Archcathedral Basilica of St. Stanislaus and St. Ladislaus
- Vilniaus Šv. Stanislovo ir Šv. Vladislovo arkikatedra bazilika (Lithuanian)
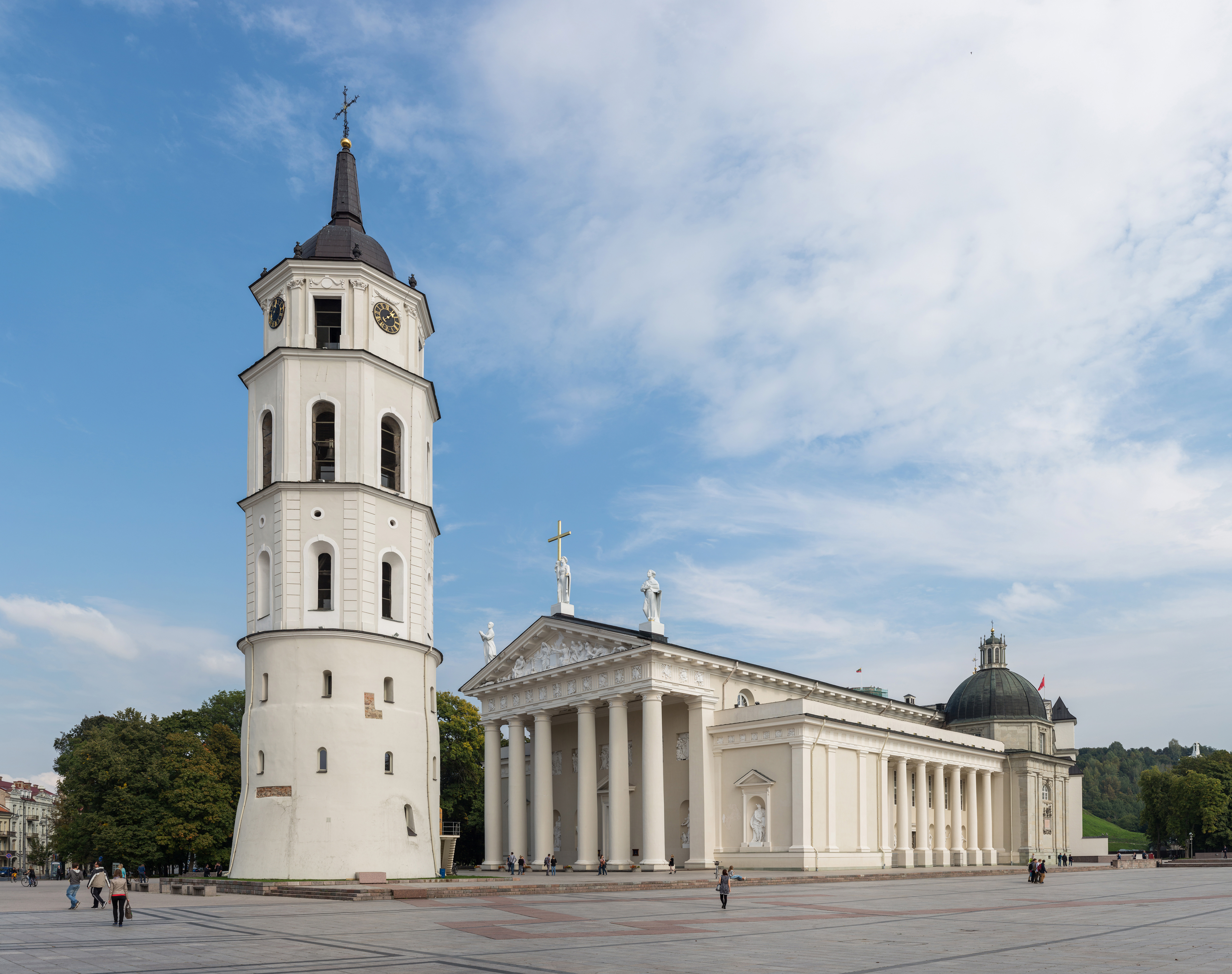
- The main façade and freestanding bell tower of Vilnius Archcathedral Basilica
- Vilnius Cathedral
- 54°41′09″N 25°17′16″E
- Location: Cathedral Square, Vilnius
- Address: Katedros a. 2
- Country: Lithuania
- Denomination: Catholic Church
- Sui iuris church: Latin Church
- Website: www.katedra.lt

History
- Status: Metropolitan archcathedral and Minor basilica
- Founded: 1387
- Founder: Jogaila
- Dedication: Saint Stanislaus and Saint Ladislaus
- Consecrated: 1388

Architecture
- Functional status: Active
- Heritage designation: Part of the Vilnius Historic Centre (World Heritage Site, 1994)
- Architect(s): Costante Tencalla (Baroque Chapel of St. Casimir); Laurynas Gucevičius (Neoclassical reconstruction); Michał Szulc (completion)
- Style: Neoclassical, with Gothic, Renaissance and Baroque elements
- Years built: 1783–1801 (present Neoclassical form)
- Completed: 1801 (Neoclassical reconstruction)

Administration
- Archdiocese: Archdiocese of Vilnius

The Vilnius Cathedral (Lithuanian: Vilniaus katedra), formally the Archcathedral Basilica of St. Stanislaus and St. Ladislaus (Lithuanian: Vilniaus Šv. Stanislovo ir Šv. Vladislovo arkikatedra bazilika), is the Roman Catholic cathedral of the Archdiocese of Vilnius and a minor basilica in Vilnius, Lithuania. Since the 14th century it serves as the seat of the Bishops and Metropolitan Archbishops of Vilnius.

Located on the Cathedral Square in the historic centre of the city, it is one of the Lithuania's most important religious and architectural monuments. Its present Neoclassical appearance largely results from the reconstruction designed by Laurynas Gucevičius in the late eighteenth century. Nevertheless, the Chapel of Saint Casimir retained its Baroque appearance designed by Costante Tencalla between 1623–1636 and the new sacristy was later built by replicating it.

Historically, the Cathedral served as the site of the Gediminids inaugurations as the Grand Dukes of Lithuania, during which Cap of Gediminas was placed on the ruler's head. In modern Lithuania, a Mass at the Archcathedral forms part of the ceremonies following the inauguration of the President of Lithuania.

The church services are held throughout the week in the Archcathedral mainly in Lithuanian language and also once a week in Latin language. Two particularly venerated images, known for graces, namely the Three-Handed Saint Casimir and Sapieha Madonna, as well as sarcophagus with the remains of Saint Casimir are located in the Archcathedral. Moreover, the monarchs of Lithuania and Poland, as well as prominent Lithuanian statesman and clergy were buried in the Archcathedral's crypts. Besides religious activities, the Archcathedral is also a venue of regular social and cultural activities.

== History ==
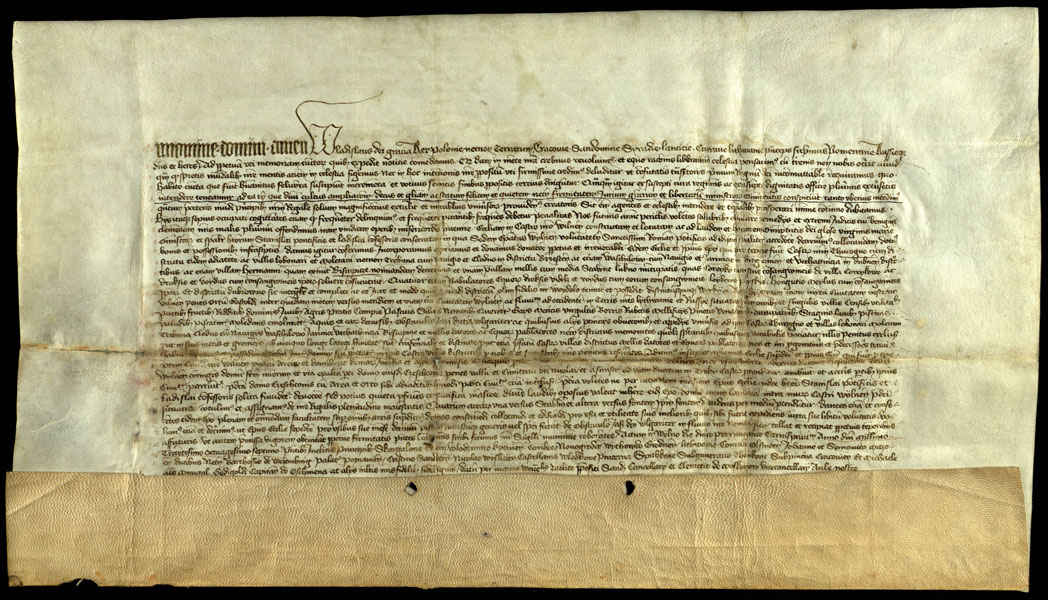
Privilege of the Lithuanian Grand Duke Jogaila in Latin to the Vilnius Cathedral, issued on 17 February 1387 in Vilnius

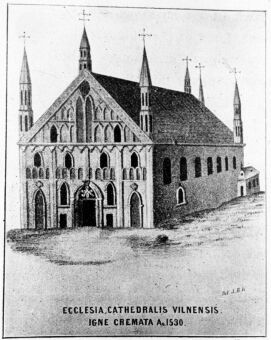
Gothic style Vilnius Cathedral, c. 1530

The origins of Christian and pre-Christian structures on the site are disputed. A long historiographical tradition, dating back to the 15th-century historian Jan Długosz, associated an earlier church beneath the present cathedral with King Mindaugas and suggested that it was subsequently adapted for pagan worship.

More recent archaeological and historical studies have questioned this interpretation, with some scholars dating the earliest masonry beneath the cathedral to the early fourteenth century and rejecting its identification as Mindaugas's cathedral. The first securely documented cathedral was founded on the initiative of Jogaila following the Christianization of Lithuania in 1387 and was consecrated in 1388.

After the cathedral was destroyed by fire in 1419, Vytautas had a substantially larger Gothic hall church built in its place. The Gothic core of Vytautas's cathedral, including much of its walls and pillars, survives within the present building. The third cathedral had three naves and four circular towers at its corners, and was similar to cathedral in Frombork. In 1522, the cathedral was renovated, and a bell tower was built on top of the Lower Castle defensive tower. Following a major fire in 1530, the cathedral was reconstructed from 1534 under the direction of Italian architects Bernardinus de Gianotis and Giovanni Cini. Further chapels and crypts were added, and by the completion of the works in the mid-sixteenth century the cathedral had acquired Renaissance architectural features.

The elevations of the Grand Dukes of Lithuania took place in the cathedral. Inside its crypts and catacombs are buried many famous people from Lithuanian and Polish history including Vytautas (1430), his wife Anna (1418), his brother Sigismund (1440), his cousin Švitrigaila (1452), Saint Casimir (1484), Alexander Jagiellon (1506), and two wives of Sigismund II Augustus: Elisabeth of Austria (1545) and Barbara Radziwiłł (1551). The heart of Władysław IV Vasa was buried there upon his death, although the rest of his body is buried at the Wawel Cathedral in Kraków.

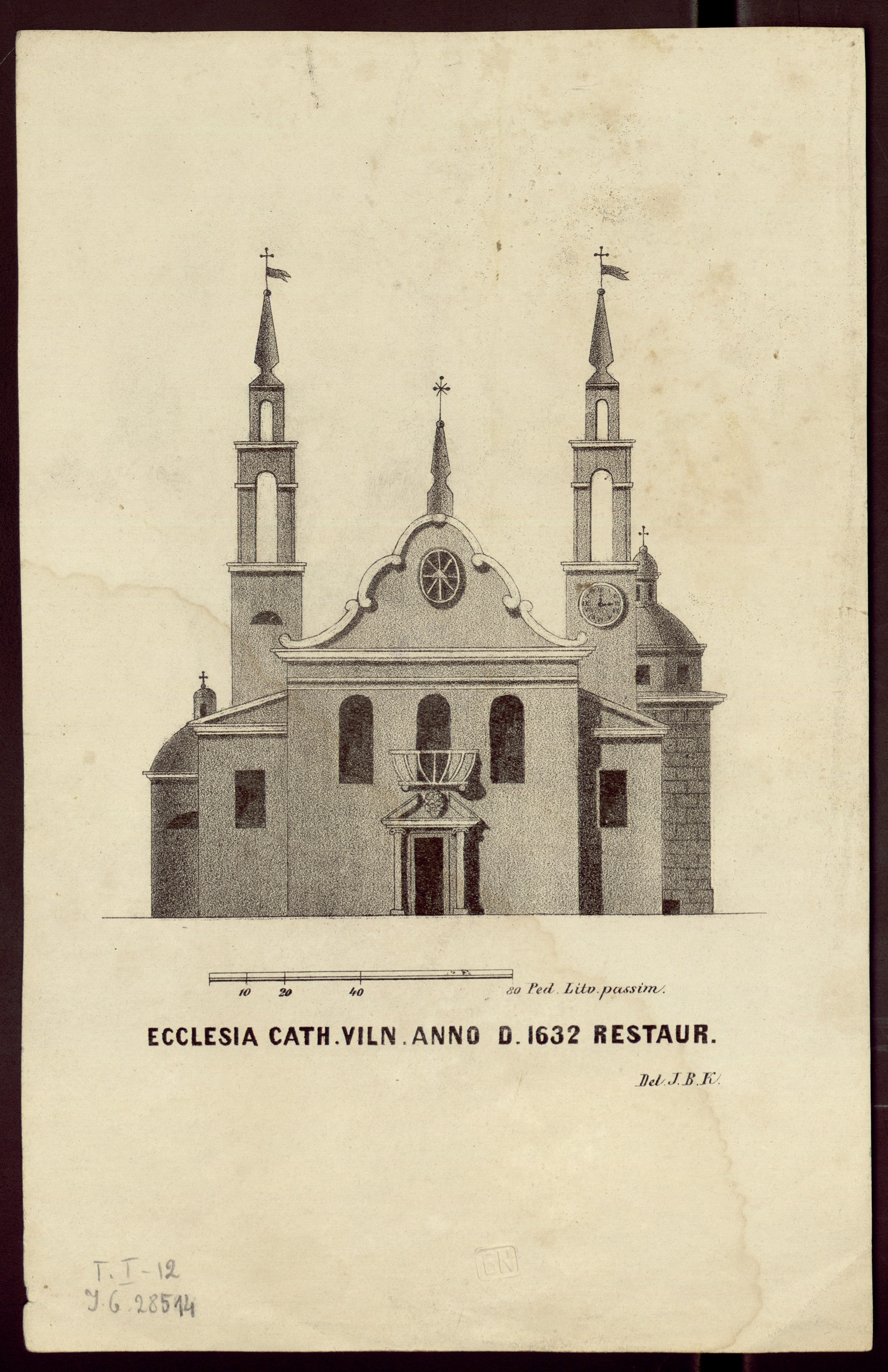
Baroque style façade of Vilnius Cathedral in 1632, depicted in a 19th century painting

In 1529 Sigismund II Augustus was elevated as Grand Duke of Lithuania in the cathedral, it was the last such ceremony. On 29 May 1580, during a ceremony in Vilnius Cathedral, Merkelis Giedraitis, Bishop of Samogitia, presented Stephen Báthory with a ceremonial sword and a pearl-encrusted hat sent and blessed by Pope Gregory XIII. The ceremony was regarded by some contemporaries and has been interpreted by historians as a symbolic substitute for the separate inauguration of a Grand Duke of Lithuania that had ceased after the Union of Lublin.

After yet another fire in 1610, the cathedral was rebuilt again until 1632, according to a project of the German architect Wilhelm Pohl, and the two front towers were added. The cathedral was damaged again in 1655 when Vilnius fell to Russian troops in the Russo-Polish War of 1654–1667. It was renovated since 1666 according to a project of the Austrian architect J. V. Salvador and redecorated several more times.

Between 1623 and 1636, at the initiative of Sigismund III Vasa and later completed by his son Wladyslaw IV Vasa, the Baroque style Chapel of Saint Casimir by royal architect Costante Tencalla was built of Swedish sandstone. Its interior was reconstructed in 1691–1692 and decorated with frescoes by Michelangelo Palloni, the altar and stuccowork by Pietro Perti. This chapel contains sculpted statues of the Jagiellon Polish Kings and Lithuanian Grand Dukes, and an epitaph with Wladyslaw IV Vasa's heart. More than anything in the Cathedral this chapel symbolizes the glory of Polish-Lithuanian union and common history.

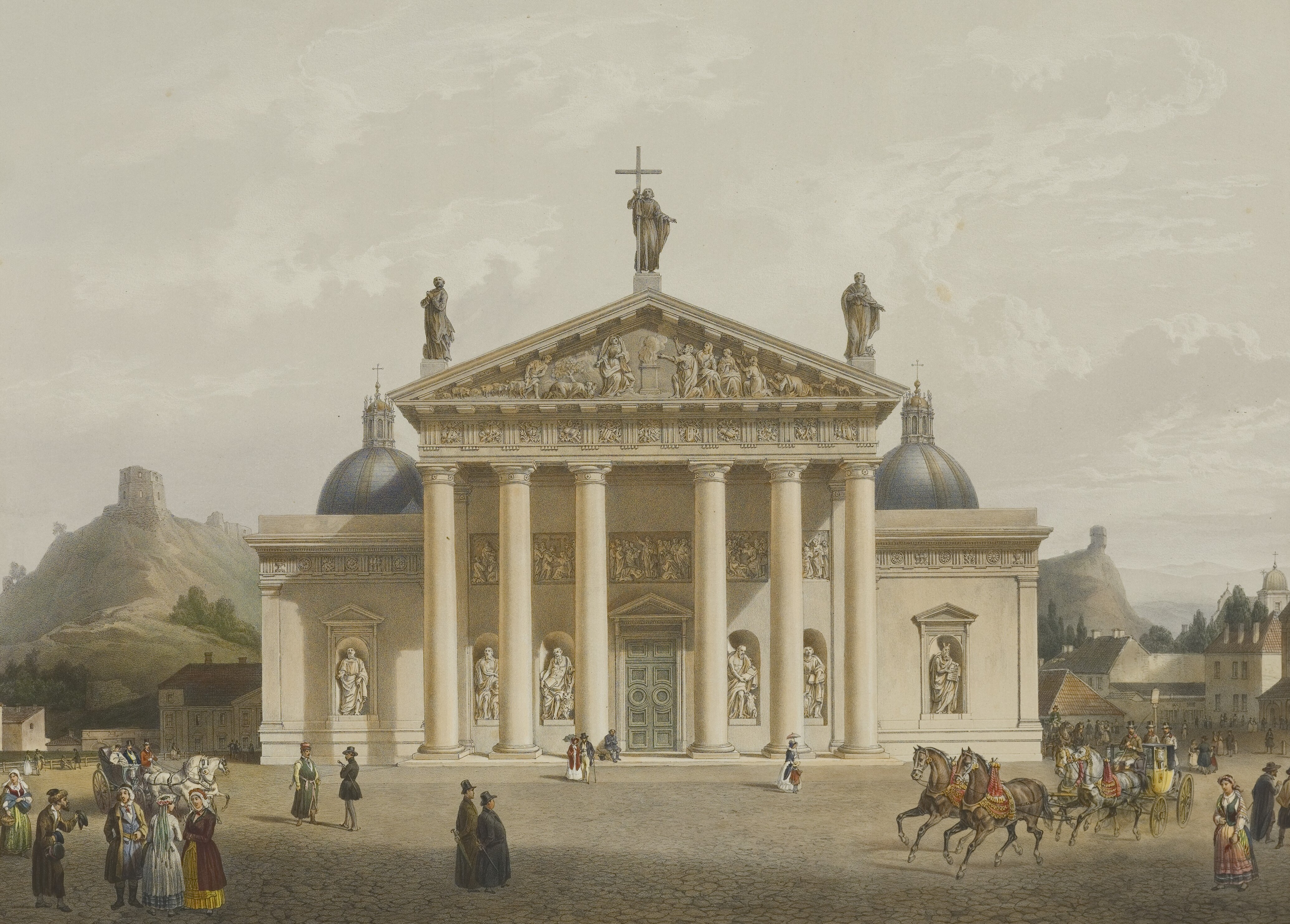
Neoclassical style façade of Vilnius Cathedral in an 1847 drawing

In 1769 the southern tower, built during the reconstruction of 1666, due to a storm collapsed, destroying the vaults of the neighboring chapel and killing 6 priests. After the damage, Bishop of Vilnius Ignacy Jakub Massalski ordered the reconstruction of the cathedral. Reconstruction in the Neoclassical style began in the early 1780s under architect Laurynas Gucevičius and was completed in 1801 by architect Michał Szulc. Stanisław August Poniatowski awarded Gucevičius the Medal Merentibus for designing the Neoclassical style Vilnius Cathedral. The church acquired a strict quadrangular shape common to local public buildings. The main facade was adorned with sculptures of the Four Evangelists by Italian sculptor Tommaso Righi. Some scholars point to the architectural resemblance of the cathedral to the works of Andrea Palladio or see the influence of Gucevičius's tutor Claude Nicolas Ledoux. The influence of Palladian architecture is evident in side facades of the building. The lack of 'purity' of the Classical architecture, due to incorporation of Baroque style sculptures and other elements, was later criticized by academical architects, notably Karol Podczaszyński.

Between 1786 and 1792 three sculptures by Karol Jelski were placed on roof of the Cathedral - Saint Casimir on the south side, Saint Stanislaus on the north, and Saint Helena in the centre. These sculptures were removed in 1950 and restored (sculptor Stanislovas Kuzma) in 1997.

During the Soviet occupation, the cathedral was converted into a warehouse. Masses were celebrated again starting in 1988, although the cathedral was still officially called The Gallery of Images at that time. In 1989, its status as a cathedral was restored. In January that year, the remains of Albertas Goštautas were discovered in the cathedral wall. On 4 September 1993, the Archcathedral was visited by the first incumbent Pope John Paul II who met there with the Lithuanian priests, seminarians, monks, and delivered a speech in Lithuanian language.

In 2002 work officially began to rebuild the Palace of the Grand Dukes of Lithuania behind the cathedral. The newly erected palace building considerably altered the context of the cathedral.

The cathedral and the belfry were renovated and the façades repainted during the 2006–2008 renovation. It was the first renovation since the restoration of Lithuania's independence in 1990.

In 2018, the cathedral's tympanum and several of its plinths were repaired. In 2022, the roof was renovated after part of it was blown off by strong winds. In 2023, the roof lantern above St Casimir's Chapel and the sacristy were repaired.

== Architecture ==
=== Exterior ===
The Archcathedral's pediment tympanum sculpture Noah's Sacrifice and three sculptures on the portico: St. Stanislaus (left), St. Helena (centre), St. Casimir with the Cap of Gediminas placed near his foots (right)

The Neoclassical architectural style cathedral has an elongated rectangular shape with projecting corner chapels. The Chapel of Saint Casimir and the sacristy feature ornate domes topped with crosses on gilded spheres. The cathedral roof was originally covered with thick copper sheeting, but during the World War I the Germans in 1917 stripped it off and replaced it with metal sheeting. Nevertheless, the cathedral's roof was later re-covered with zinc sheeting.

The main façade is dominated by a portico of six Doric columns supporting a triangular pediment. Its tympanum contains Tommaso Righi’s high relief Noah’s Sacrifice, depicting Noah and his family offering a sacrifice after the Flood. The figures are arranged around a smoking altar, with animals occupying the spaces between them and the corners of the composition. Three statues stand above the pediment: Saint Helena in the centre, holding a cross and the Holy Nails, Saint Stanislaus to the north, and Saint Casimir to the south. Casimir is depicted with a grand ducal cap at his feet, symbolising his renunciation of earthly power. The present statues were made by Stanislovas Kuzma in 1997 to replace the originals, which were destroyed by the Soviet authorities in 1950.

Six statues by Righi occupy niches in the main façade. Abraham, holding a knife, and Moses, carrying the Tablets of the Law, flank the four Evangelists: Matthew, Mark, Luke and John, accompanied by their respective symbols of an angel, a lion, an ox and an eagle. Their Baroque forms contrast with the restrained architecture of the portico. Five relief panels above the niches depict episodes from the Acts of the Apostles: the Descent of the Holy Spirit, the healing of a lame man, Saint Peter preaching (the biggest central panel, above the main entrance), Saint Paul healing a sick man, and the deaths of Ananias and Sapphira.

The Archcathedral's southern façade with seven sculptures of the Jagiellonian monarchs of Lithuania and Poland

The north and south façades have similar, symmetrical compositions. Each features a colonnade of six Doric columns linking the projecting chapels. Raised on pedestals, these columns are smaller and more slender than those of the main portico. Behind them, pilasters alternate with tall rectangular windows and niches containing statues. The southern niches contain seven figures associated with the Jagiellonian dynasty, including Saint Casimir, although the individual identities of the other figures remain uncertain. Their attributes include armour, crowns and sceptres. The northern niches contain smaller figures of apostles and saints associated with the Society of Jesus, placed on taller pedestals. Both groups are characterised by animated poses and flowing drapery. The southern sculptures date to 1754 and the northern group to 1754–1768. They originally adorned the main and side altars of the Church of Saint Casimir and were transferred to the cathedral in 1832, following the church’s closure after the November Uprising.

Cartouche on the wall of St. Casimir's Chapel (the west wall of the Archcathedral)

The exterior of the Chapel of Saint Casimir bears a Baroque foundation plaque, attributed to Costante Tencalla and dated 1636. Its marble inscription panel is enclosed by an elaborate sandstone frame decorated with heraldic cartouches, garlands, wings, cornices, volutes and a mascaron. The Latin inscription commemorates the patronage of Sigismund III Vasa, King of Poland and Sweden and Grand Duke of Lithuania, and the completion of the chapel’s decoration under his son, Władysław IV Vasa, in 1636. Above the plaque is a window with a moulded surround decorated with volutes and a garland. Its design, like that of the chapel as a whole, reflects the influence of Carlo Maderno.

The freestanding bell tower in front of the cathedral incorporates a former defensive tower of the Lower Castle. It reaches a height of 57 metres, including the cross. Its square underground base dates to the thirteenth century and is among the oldest surviving masonry structures in Lithuania. Above ground, a circular lower section supports three octagonal stages, capped by a domed roof with a pyramidal spire. The clock has hour hands only.

The bell tower’s historic bells include one cast by Joannes Delamars in 1673, decorated with figurative scenes and ornamental bands and used to strike the hours. Other bells were cast by Andrew Dorling, Karol Gotlyb Sparr, Gustav Miorka and Philip Jacob Ginter. Six additional bells were donated by Cardinal Joachim Meisner, Archbishop of Cologne. The largest, named Joachim, weighs 2,600 kilograms.

=== Interior ===
The High Altar

The cathedral’s interior combines a Gothic spatial arrangement with predominantly Neoclassical decoration introduced during Laurynas Gucevičius’s reconstruction. The rectangular body forms a hall church, with a broad central nave and two narrower aisles separated by massive piers. Doric pilasters articulate the walls, alternating with entrances to the side chapels framed by triangular pediments. The vaults and arches are decorated with laurel garlands and rosettes. Earlier architectural elements survive in the chapels, notably the Baroque interiors of the Chapel of Saint Casimir and the Wołłowicz Chapel. At the eastern end, the high altar ensemble is dominated by a Neoclassical portico framing Franciszek Smuglewicz’s The Death of Saint Stanislaus (1799). Its pediment contains the Eye of Providence, and a crucifix dated 1805 stands above it. The ensemble preserves the distinction between the former vicars’ altar beneath the portico and the chapter altar with its tabernacle farther west. A freestanding marble altar for the celebration of Mass was installed in the presbytery in 2007 and consecrated on 24 December that year. The chapter altar’s tabernacle incorporates reliefs by Matthias Walbaum, dated approximately 1623–1625, depicting the Last Supper, Christ Washing the Disciples’ Feet and the Agony in the Garden. Its nineteenth-century reconstruction followed a design by Karol Podczaszyński.

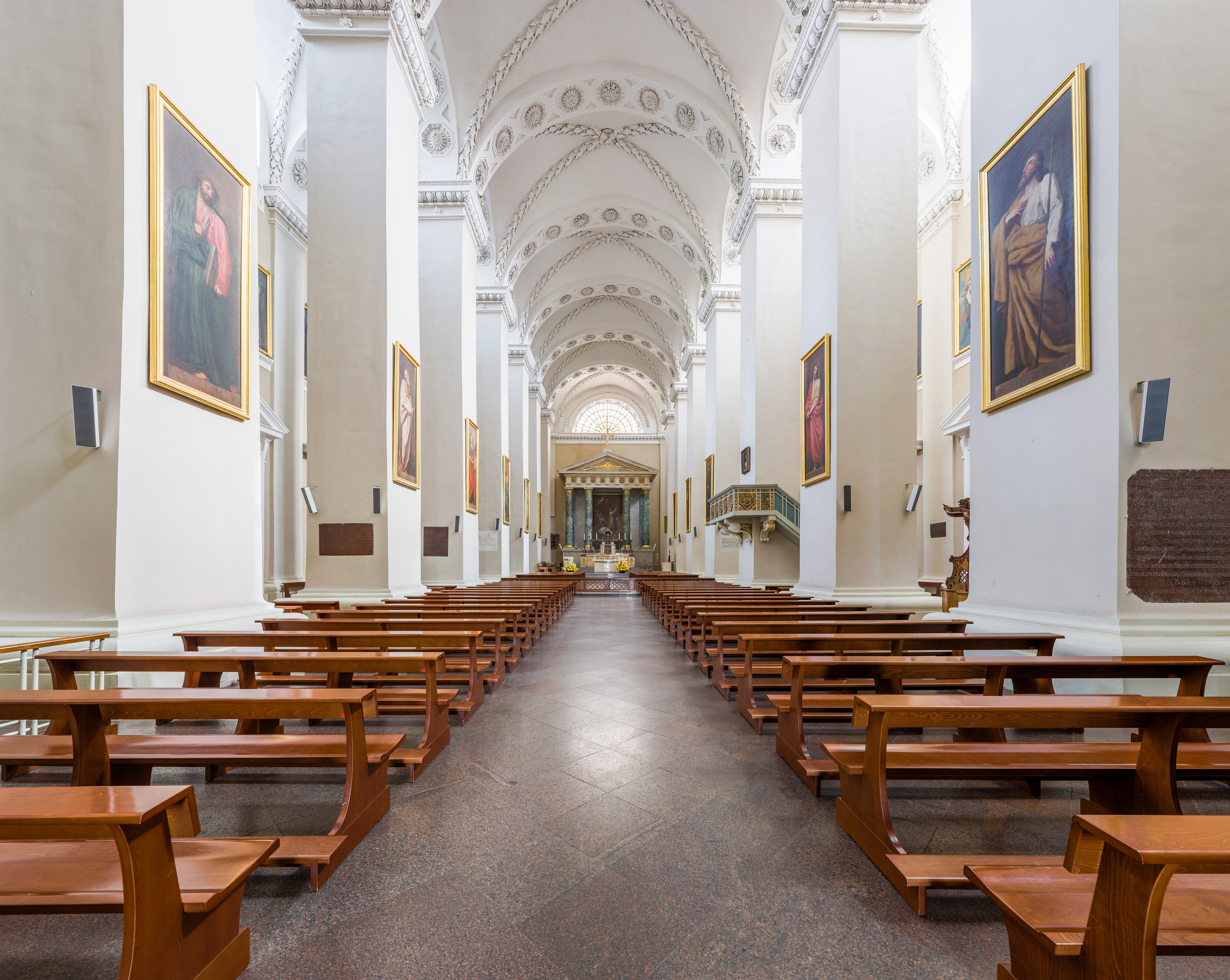
The main central nave, viewed towards the High Altar

Two allegorical stucco sculptures by Tommaso Righi, executed between 1785 and 1791, occupy niches at the eastern ends of the aisles. Love of Neighbour, in the south aisle, depicts a man giving bread to a blind beggar. Their gestures link the figures, while their contrasting scale emphasises the relationship between benefactor and recipient. Love of God, in the north aisle, depicts a man looking and pointing towards heaven, his figure enveloped in flowing drapery.

Smuglewicz also painted the Twelve Apostles displayed on the piers of the central nave. Two further paintings by him, both dated 1785, hang at the eastern ends of the aisles: Melchizedek Meeting Abraham to the south and The Multiplication of the Loaves to the north. Together with the high altarpiece, they develop themes of sacrifice and priesthood. A copy of Guido Reni’s Ecce Homo hangs above the pulpit.

A cycle of sixteen biblical paintings by Costantino Villani hangs above the chapel entrances in the side aisles. Eight Old Testament scenes occupy the south aisle, while eight New Testament scenes occupy the north. The paintings are arranged in corresponding pairs that connect Old Testament episodes with events in the life of Christ and the early Church. Painitngs are arranged as follows, starting from the altar: in the main central nave – The Creation of Adam and Eve, The Murder of Abel, The Sacrifice of Isaac, Jacob's Dream, Joseph's Journey, Moses on Mount Sinai, Joshua's Victory, and The Judgment of Solomon, while in the side aisles – The Annunciation, The Nativity of Jesus, The Massacre of the Innocents, The Three Kings, The Flight into Egypt, The Baptism of Jesus, The Appearance of Jesus, and The Descent of the Holy Spirit.

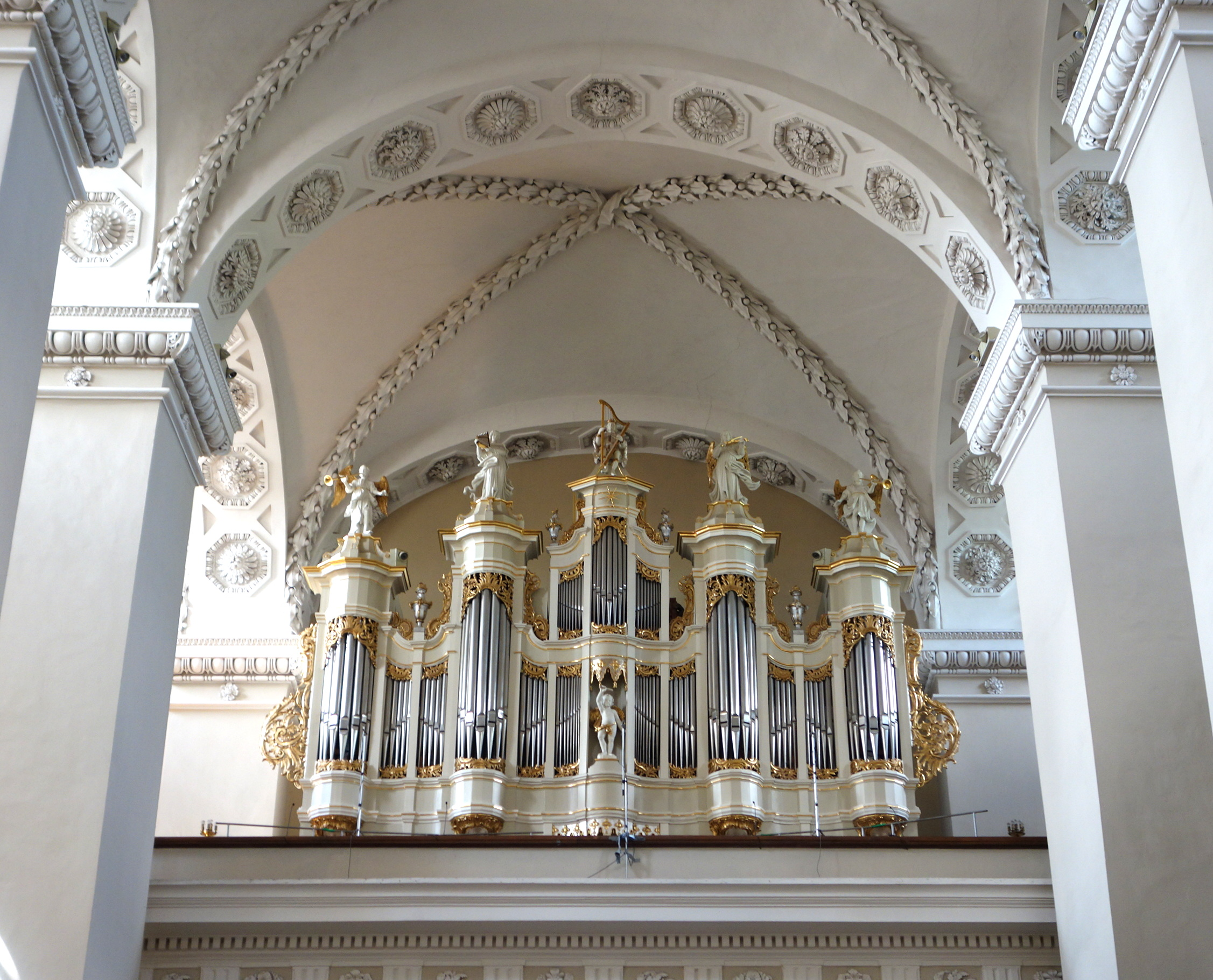
Vilnius Archcathedral Organ

At the western end stands an eighteenth-century Baroque organ case, transferred to the cathedral in 1859 from the Augustinian Church of the Blessed Virgin Mary of Consolation and enlarged with lateral towers. Its carved and gilded decoration includes foliage, shell motifs, a figure of King David playing the harp and angels playing musical instruments. The organ was rebuilt by Józef Rudowicz in 1885–1889 and subsequently altered by Wacław Biernacki. The present instrument, installed by Alexander Schuke of Potsdam in 1969, has three manuals and 49 stops and incorporates several ranks of nineteenth-century pipes made by Radavičius. The cathedral’s first organ was installed in 1595 by the organ builder John Kopelman, the woodcarver Bernard Holc and the painter Kristupas Bžeskis. It was destroyed by fire in 1610. A large replacement was built around 1618, but was destroyed during the Russian invasion in the mid-seventeenth century. The organ was subsequently rebuilt. Until the mid-nineteenth century, the cathedral used a relatively small organ with approximately 25 stops.

==== Chapels and sacristy ====
The Vilnius Cathedral currently has eleven chapels and they were unified by the Lithuanian architect Laurynas Gucevičius in the late 18th century.

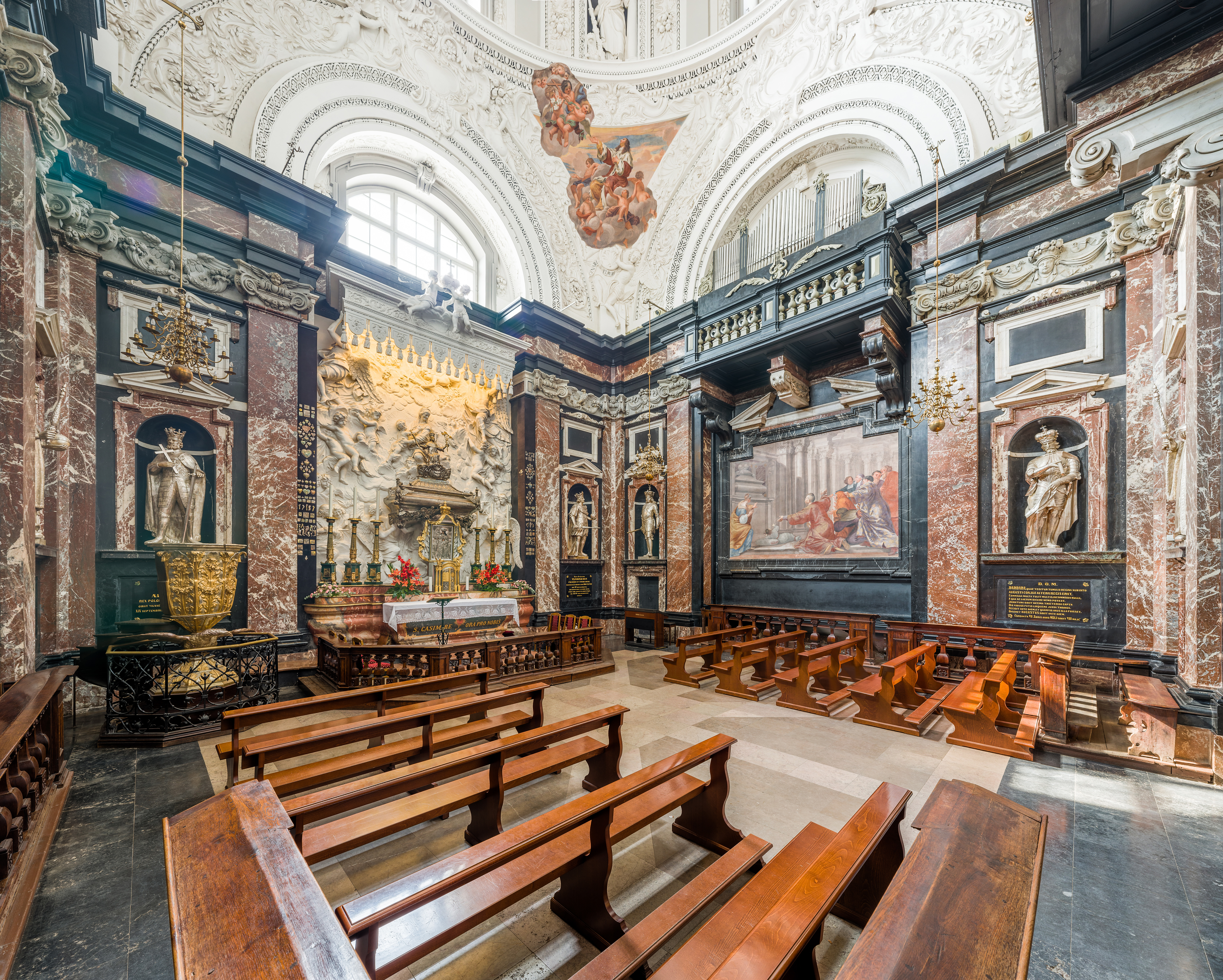
The Chapel of Saint Casimir with his remains sarcophagus and an icon Three-Handed Saint Casimir in the centre

The construction of the Chapel of Saint Casimir in the right-side nave was begun by Sigismund III Vasa and was completed by his son Władysław IV Vasa. It is a square, Baroque style chapel built of Swedish sandstone, and its interior is clad in marble. Its altar houses a sarcophagus with the remains of Saint Casimir, the patron saint of Lithuania and its youth. In front of the sarcophagus is an icon Three-Handed Saint Casimir, which is believed to be painted in 1521, partly covered with a silver trim, which was manufactured by local masters in the 18th century. In the 17th century on the eastern and western walls of the chapel two frescoes were painted by the Italian painter Michelangelo Palloni in which are depicted two miraculous events which happened at the Archcathedral's Chapel of the Blessed Virgin Mary (also known as the Old Royal Chapel): on the eastern wall Uncovering of St. Casimir's Coffin, which depict the uncovering of St. Casimir's coffin on September 16, 1604 and discovering that his body is not decomposed, as well as this event participant Vilnian Bishop Benediktas Vaina, who praises the God for this miracle with his hands raised and looking towards heaven, and on the western wall Ursula's Resurrection from the Dead, which depict the first known miracle of St. Casimir when a dead body of young lady Ursula was placed near the St. Casimir's remains coffin and resurrected, in the frescoe Ursula is depicted reaching out towards the St. Casimir's sarcophagus, while in the right side from her are depicted surprised priests, nobles, and Ursula's relatives. In 1640, Palloni also painted four frescoes on the chapel's dome: in the corners near the altar St. Casimir's Hymn to the Blessed Virgin Mary and St. Casimir Accompanied to Heaven, as well as The Struggle Against Passions and The Victory of Virtue in the corners near chapel's entrance. The chapel's dome is also decorated with sculptures: four women (depicts allegorical virtues), fruits ornaments, and ornate niche surrounds. Moreover, in the chapel's niches eight standing males sculptures were built in 1692 (renewed in 1837), whose all identities are not exactly known and attributed to specific sculptures, but they all believed to be monarchs of Lithuania and Poland: Sigismund II Augustus, Alexander Jagiellon, Władysław II Jagiełło, John I Albert, Władysław IV Vasa, Duke Casimir, Sigismund I the Old, Saint Casimir.

Beyond the Chapel of St. Casimir, towards the main entrance of the Cathedral, lies the Chapel of Bishops, formerly called the Chapel of the Blessed Sacrament, which was built in the early 16th century by the Bishop of Vilnius John of the Lithuanian Dukes. From 1537 onwards, Bishops of Vilnius were interred in the crypt beneath this chapel. The wall decoration of the Chapel of Bishops was created by the Polish artist Jerzy Hoppen. A memorial plaque dedicated to Bishop Antanas Pranciškus Audzevičius hangs in the chapel. Moreover, Bishop Ignacy Jakub Massalski and Archbishop Julijonas Steponavičius are buried in the chapel's crypt.

Further along stands a chapel that has gone by various names and Bishops of Vilnius were also buried in its crypt. A memorial plaque dedicated to Bishop Jonas Civinskis hangs in the chapel, which also houses an office. Next to this chapel is a side entrance providing access to the Cathedral from the Cathedral Square.

The Goštautai Chapel, where the painting Sapieha Madonna and the remains of Albertas Goštautas are located

Behind this chapel lies the Chapel of the Shroud of Turin, previously called the Manvydai Chapel, which funded in 1423 by Albertas Manvydas, the first Voivode of Vilnius, and was later redesigned by the architect Laurynas Gucevičius. After the Cathedral was closed in the 20th century by the Soviet authorities, the chapel's contents were looted and its interior was damaged, however some frescoes have survived. Currently, this chapel contains a reproduction of the Shroud of Turin, which was gifted to the Cathedral in 2000.

The Goštautai Chapel, located further along, was founded in the 15th century by Martynas Goštautas, the Voivode of Trakai. Two Renaissance style funerary monuments, commemorating Albertas Goštautas, the Grand Chancellor of Lithuania, and Bishop Paweł Holszański, are set into the chapel's walls. On a wall in the chapel hangs a painting titled Sapieha Madonna, also known as The Blessed Virgin Mary, Venerated by St. Francis of Assisi and St. Bernardine of Siena, which was painted by an unknown artist in the late 15th century or 16th century, and repainted in the early 17th century.

The last chapel near the entrance is named the Chapel of the Exiles and is dedicated to the memory of the victims of the Soviet deportations from Lithuania. This chapel was originally founded in 1495 by Albertas I Taboras, Bishop of Vilnius, therefore it also called the Old Bishops' Chapel and was also previously called the Chapel of the Most Holy Name of the Virgin Mary, Our Lady of Częstochowa, and St. John Nepomucene. Jan Nepomucen Kossakowski, Bishop of Vilnius, is buried in the chapel's crypt, and a memorial plaque dedicated to him hangs on the left wall. Statues of saints stand in the chapel's niches. A crucifix, relocated from the Valavičiai Chapel, hangs above the altar.

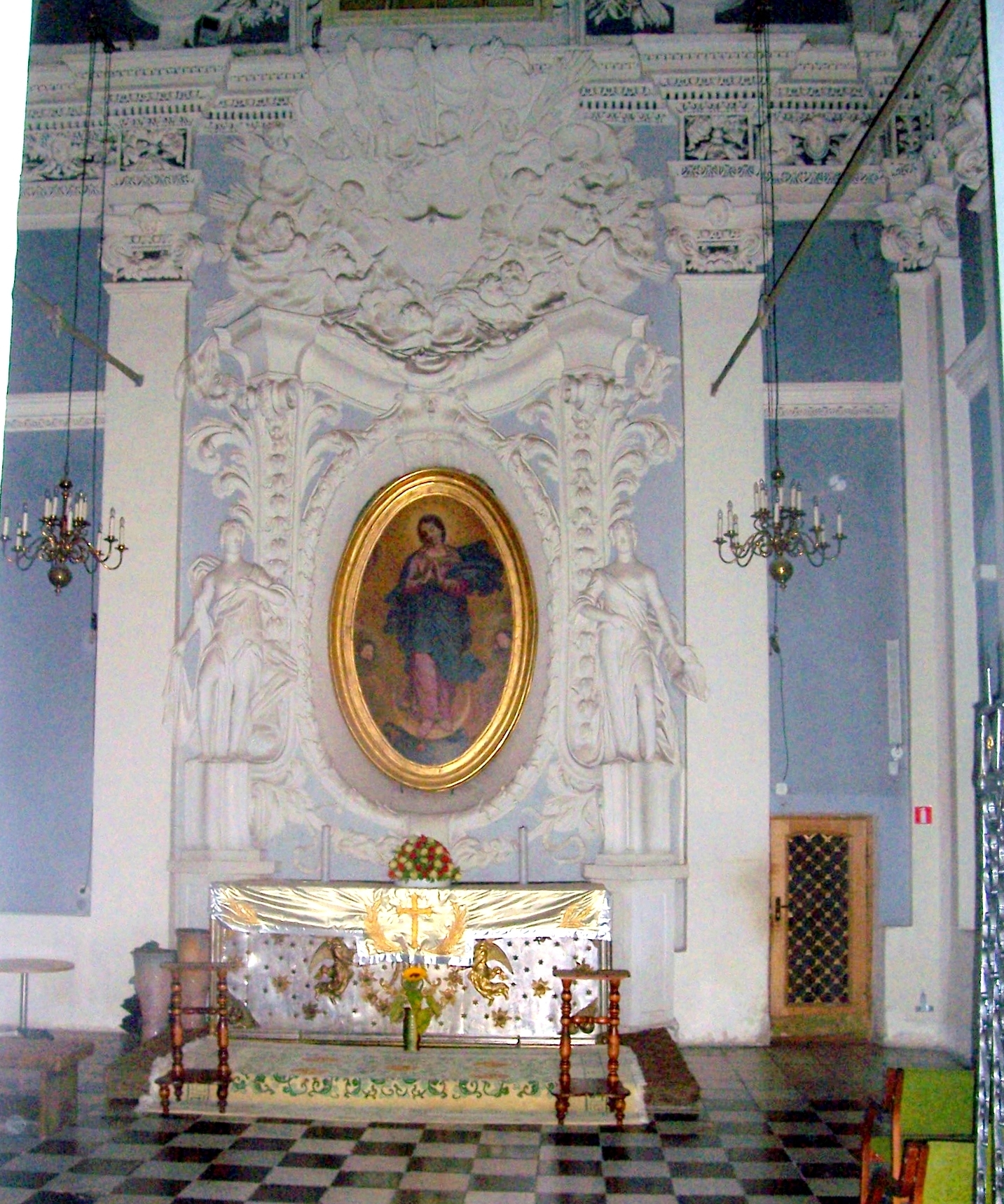
The Chapel of the Blessed Virgin Mary, where Sigismund II Augustus secretly married Barbara Radziwiłł in 1547

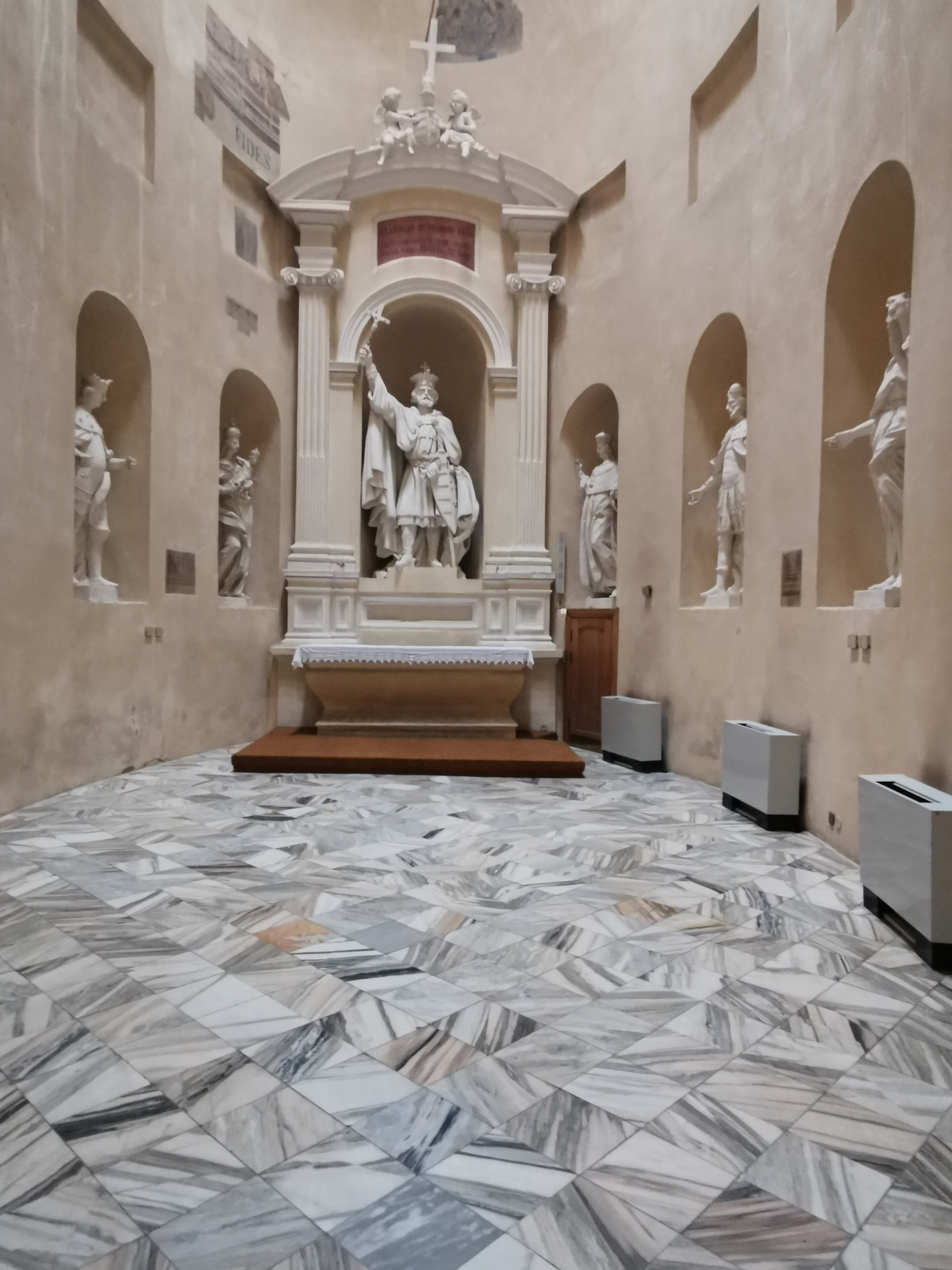
The Chapel of Saint Ladislaus

The first chapel to the left of the Cathedral's main entrance is the Chapel of Saint Ladislaus, dedicated Saint Ladislaus, which was designed by the architect Laurynas Gucevičius. Prior to the fire of 1530, the sacristy of the Royal Chapel and one of the Cathedral's towers stood on this site. The chapel was designed with original frescoes, however they only fragmentaly survived. In the centre of the chapel stands an altar and sculpture of Saint Ladislaus, which was covered until 1905 by the order of the Russian Empire's authorities. The chapel is oval-shaped and features a ornately decorated dome. A memorial plaque dedicated to the Bishop of Vilnius, Benediktas Vaina, hangs nearby.

The Cathedral also houses the Chapel of the Blessed Virgin Mary, also known as the Valavičiai Chapel or the Old Royal Chapel. This chapel was founded in 1473 by Casimir IV Jagiellon, the King of Poland and Grand Duke of Lithuania, and son of the Cathedral's founder Władysław II Jagiełło. The chapel burned down in 1530 and was rebuilt in 1534 by Sigismund the Old, the King of Poland and Grand Duke of Lithuania. In 1547, Sigismund II Augustus, the King of Poland and Grand Duke of Lithuania, secretly married his beloved Barbara Radziwiłł in this chapel, while the ceremony was also attended by Barbara's brother Mikołaj Radziwiłł the Red, Barbara's cousin Mikołaj Radziwiłł the Black, witness Stanislovas Kęsgaila, and a ceremonial priest. Subsequently, the remains of Saint Casimir, Alexander Jagiellon, and both wives of Sigismund II Augustus: Elizabeth Habsburg and Barbara Radziwiłł were kept in the chapel's crypt for a time. The chapel was later reconstructed at the initiative of Eustachy Wołłowicz, Bishop of Vilnius. Near the eastern wall of the chapel there is a tombstone of Eustachy Wołłowicz and his remains are buried there. Currently, the chapel is rectangular and topped by a ornamentally decorated dome featuring depictions of the Four Evangelists. Its Late Baroque altar stands against the northern wall and it features a 17th century painting of Mary, mother of Jesus, above which the Holy Spirit is depicted amidst clouds. The altar also dates back to the 17th century.

Next to the Valavičiai Chapel stands the Chapel of Mercy, which was previously called the Kęsgailos Chapel as it was originally built in 1436 by Mykolas Kęsgaila, the Voivode of Vilnius and the Grand Chancellor of Lithuania. For a long time the chapel was closed to visitors, however it was reopened after restoration in 2020. The chapel contains relics of Saint Faustina Kowalska, Blessed Michał Sopoćko, Pope John Paul II, and a reproduction of the painting Merciful Jesus. Moreover, a memorial plaque commemorating the first Franciscan martyrs of Vilnius is embedded in the chapel wall, while this plaque was relocated here from the Franciscans Church of the Assumption of the Blessed Virgin Mary.

Further along lies the Chapel of the Holy Sepulchre, which is also closed to the public. The Holy Sepulchre was designed by Vilnius University professor Karol Podczaszyński.

Beyond Chapel of the Holy Sepulchre is the Cathedral's northern entrance, which was installed on the site of an old chapel known as the second Kęsgailos Chapel. Two sacristies are located past the side entrance.

The Chapel of St. Peter, also known as the Chapel of the Relics of the Blessed, was opened in the left nave in 2018 and it honors the relics of two Lithuanian archbishops: Blessed Jurgis Matulaitis-Matulevičius and Blessed Teofilius Matulionis. The relics were transferred from the central altar to the chapel, which is adorned with images of Jurgis Matulaitis-Matulevičius and Teofilius Matulionis. The chapel also contains the tombstone of Władysław Bandurski, the former Bishop of Chania, however his remains were relocated to Poland.

The Cathedral's sacristy is located at the end of the left nave, which is octagonal and features a dome. It was constructed in the late 18th century according to a design of architect Laurynas Gucevičius and its exterior appearance is nearly identical to the Chapel of St. Casimir. The interior of the sacristy's dome was painted by the Vilnian painter Albert Żamett and features floral motifs as well as four women symbolizing virtues with Latin inscriptions: Fortitudo (Fortitude), Justitia (Justice), Sapientia (Wisdom), Temperantia (Self-restraint). A gate separates the sacristy from the Cathedral's side nave.

==== Monuments and memorials ====
Baroque style epitaphs with memorial plaques of Samuel Pac (left) and Jerzy Tyszkiewicz (right)

The cathedral contains approximately 37 epitaphs and commemorative plaques, alongside portrait busts and funerary monuments. Mounted on its walls and piers, they commemorate rulers, bishops, clergy and benefactors, as well as events in the cathedral’s history. Many bear Latin inscriptions recording the offices, endowments and achievements of those commemorated.

The Baroque memorials include the monument to Samuel Pac, Grand Standard-Bearer of Lithuania, who died in 1627. Erected between 1629 and 1633 in the south aisle and attributed to Costante Tencalla, it combines black and reddish-brown marble with limestone, materials also used in the contemporary decoration of the Chapel of Saint Casimir. Its Latin inscription recounts Pac’s military service and identifies his brother Stefan as the monument’s patron.

Also in the south aisle is the Baroque memorial to Jerzy Tyszkiewicz, Bishop of Vilnius. It incorporates a bronze portrait bust made around 1652 by Giovanni Francesco Rossi for the bishops’ residence at Verkiai. Subsequently incorporated into the funerary monument, the bust occupies a round-headed niche above a Latin inscription commemorating the bishop’s ecclesiastical career and patronage.

In the left side: epitaph of Tomasz Wawrzecki with his bust; in the right side: painting of the Lithuanian Grand Duke Vytautas the Great and his memorial plaque with a restored Bona Sforza's historical inscription from 1573 in Latin, placed near the High Altar.

A granite plaque erected in 1636 commemorates Jokūbas Naporkovskis, his wife Ona Bieniašaitė and their son-in-law Tomas Laurinavičius, who died during a plague epidemic. The inscription records a bequest of 5,000 florins to the cathedral’s vicars in return for regular Masses for the deceased. It concludes with a quotation from the Book of Psalms.

The Neoclassical monument to Tomasz Wawrzecki, a Lithuania-born supreme commander of the Kościuszko Uprising, stands in the north aisle near the sacristy. Created around 1820 by Kazimierz Jelski and commissioned by Wawrzecki’s brother Józef, it combines cast iron, marble and plaster with gilded and silvered decoration. A portrait bust occupies a niche above the memorial inscription, with heraldic and military decorations below.

Other epitaphs commemorate Bishop of Vilnius Benedykt Woyna, bishop Mikołaj Słupski, Vilnius canons Martynas Šulcas-Volfovičius, and Adam Zabłocki, Swedish-born priest Olaf Algin, Barbara Zawisza, and Katarzyna Potocka, wife of Janusz Radziwiłł. Their inscriptions record biographical details and, in some cases, provisions for prayers and services for the deceased.

Bust of Jonas Basanavičius

A black marble plaque commemorating Vytautas the Great stands against the eastern wall of the north aisle, below a full-length portrait of Vytautas, transferred in the nineteenth century from the church he had founded in Brest. Plaque, made by Józef Kozłowski and installed in 1853 at the initiative of Eustachy Tyszkiewicz, reproduces an earlier inscription associated with Queen Bona Sforza. The text records her commissioning of a memorial slab and its placement by Bishop Walerian Protasewicz in 1573. A separate plaque installed in 1990 commemorates Vytautas’s patronage of the cathedral.

Twentieth-century memorials include monuments to Jonas Basanavičius (placed in 1989) and Archbishop Jan Cieplak. Near the sacristy, a bronze bust and plaque commemorate Jurgis Matulaitis-Matulevičius, Bishop of Vilnius from 1918 to 1925. Installed in 1993, the bust is the work of Konstantinas Bogdanas. The accompanying inscriptions are in Latin and Lithuanian, and the bishop’s coat of arms appears below with his motto, Vince malum in bono (“Overcome evil with good”).

Several plaques commemorate the cathedral’s institutional history. A white marble plaque with gilded Latin lettering records its elevation to a minor basilica in 1922 and bears the emblem of the cathedral chapter. Another plaque, installed in 1997, commemorates the cathedral school, first documented in 1397.

Later additions commemorate Mindaugas’s coronation, anniversaries associated with Saint Casimir, the Christianisation of Lithuania and the visits of Pope John Paul II in 1993 and Pope Francis in 2018.

==== Crypts ====
Frescoe in the Archcathedral's basements, dating to the late 14th century is the oldest surviving frescoe in Lithuania

Currently, there are 27 chambers in the Archcathedral's basements. Some basements are grouped together, allowing passage from one chamber to another. The exhibition installed in the Archcathedral's basements reflects the history of the Archcathedral and the stages of its construction and reconstruction – spanning from the first Lithuanian cathedral possibly built by the Lithuanian King Mindaugas in the 13th century to its final reconstruction based on the late 18th-century design of the Lithuanian architect Laurynas Gucevičius.

Moreover, the Archcathedral's crypt house the oldest frescoe in Lithuania which was painted in fresco-secco technique in the late 14th century soon after the Christianization of Lithuania. The frescoe was discovered by the Lithuanian restoration architect Napaleonas Kitkauskas in 1985 and contain the scene of the Crucifixion of Jesus in the centre, from the left-side standing is Mary, mother of Jesus, and from the right-side standing is Saint John the Apostle.

Prominent figures of the Grand Duchy of Lithuania: Lithuanian nobles, bishops, and princes were buried in the crypts of the Cathedral. Princes were typically interred in crypts situated beneath the floors of the naves or side chapels. There are twenty crypts in total. Some crypts bear specific names, such as the Royal Crypt, the Chapter's Crypt, and the Bishops' Crypt. The architect Laurynas Gucevičius had walled up the entrances to the crypts. In 1930, researchers were able to access only the crypts of the Valavičiai Chapel and Goštautai Chapel. Members of the Cathedral's Chapter were historically buried in a crypt located beneath the floor of presbytery, but their remains were relocated due to a flood in 1931.

Entrance to the crypt where the remains of the monarchs of Lithuania and Poland were rediscovered in 1931

Underground mausoleum of the monarchs of Lithuania and Poland

Buried in the crypts of Vilnius Archcathedral are: Lithuanian Grand Duke Vytautas the Great (1430) and his first wife Lithuanian Grand Duchess Anna (1418), Jogaila's brothers Alexander Vygantas (1392) and Karigaila (1390), Vytautas the Great's brother Lithuanian Grand Duke Sigismund Kęstutaitis (1440) and his son Michael Žygimantaitis (1452), Jogaila's brother Lithuanian Grand Duke Švitrigaila (1452), Polish King and Lithuanian Grand Duke Alexander Jagiellon (1506), Polish King and Lithuanian Grand Duke Sigismund II Augustus's first wife, Elizabeth Habsburg (1545), and his second wife, Barbara Radziwiłł (1551), Bishop Walerian Protasewicz (1580), heart of the Polish King and Lithuanian Grand Duke Władysław IV Vasa (1648).

Following severe flooding in Vilnius in spring 1931, restoration work in the cathedral led to the discovery of a previously sealed royal crypt beneath the main nave on 21 September 1931. It contained the remains of Alexander Jagiellon, and Elisabeth of Austria and Barbara Radziwiłł, the two wives of Sigismund II Augustus. The Royal Mausoleum beneath the Chapel of Saint Casimir was completed in 1939, where rests in coffins the remains of Alexander Jagiellon, Elizabeth Habsburg, Barbara Radziwiłł, and Władysław IV Vasa's heart in an urn.

Although Vytautas the Great was buried near his first wife Anna in the cathedral in 1430, the present location of his remains is unknown. In the 15th century Vytautas the Great was buried close to the location where in the late 18th century a sculpture Love of God was built. Due to the Cathedral's fire in the 16th century, the remains of Vytautas the Great were moved to the Old Royal Crypt (now Valavičiai Crypt), but later under the guidance of Bishop Walerian Protasewicz the remains of Vytautas the Great were returned to the previous location and a tombstone was created, containing a Latin inscription by Bona Sforza. The 16th century tombstone of Vytautas the Great was destroyed during the mid-17th century war with Russia, however at the time the remains of Vytautas the Great were possibly hidden. Priest Franciszek Ksawery Bohusz wrote in his 1806 letter addressed to the Duke Adam Kazimierz Czartoryski (currently located at the Czartoryski Archive in Kraków): "As a prelate of Vilnius Cathedral, driven by curiosity, I wanted to see the crypt containing the remains of Vytautas and Alexander. No one could show it to me. The sacristan does not even know they are buried here. Yet they are the Cathedral's founders!"

In 2011, archaeologist Vytautas Urbanavičius proposed that Vytautas the Great's remains might also have been discovered in the Cathedral's crypt in 1931 and subsequently reinterred separately. On 10 April 2026, heritage researcher Saulius Poderis presented interwar period archival photographs of four remains and documents concerning plans for four sarcophagi, which he interpreted as evidence that a fourth set of remains had been discovered in 1931. Poderis suggested that the discovery had been concealed by Poles for political reasons amid Polish–Lithuanian tensions over Vilnius. However, the identification of the purported fourth set of remains as those of Vytautas the Great has not been confirmed, and further archaeological and historical investigation is required. In the summer of 2026 the Archcathedral's 3D scanning, investigation using ground-penetrating radar and masonry analysis was started. In August 2026, the Lithuanian Minister of Culture Lukas Alsys visited Ukraine and discussed with the Ukrainian authorities representatives the possibilities to extract DNA from the remains of members of the Olelkovich family, a branch of the Gediminids, who are buried at the crypts of the Kyiv Pechersk Lavra in Kyiv as their DNA could be useful to identify the remains of their relative Vytautas the Great. On September 9, 2026, Lithuanian scientists conducting research in the Archcathedral announced that they discovered 20 previously unexplored areas in its walls and basements. According to the Director of the Lithuanian Institute of History, Aurimas Švedas, these cavities, as well as the potential location of Vytautas the Great's remains, will be investigated using minimally invasive methods.

In 1986, a number of burial sites were discovered at varying depths between the western walls of the first Cathedral and the central crypt.

On December 16, 2024, burial regalia and other items belonging to the monarchs of Lithuania and Poland: Alexander Jagiellon, Elizabeth Habsburg, and Barbara Radziwiłł, originally hidden by the Vilnius Cathedral chapter in a crypt's wall in 1939, were discovered: the crown of Alexander Jagiellon, also the crown, chain, medallion, ring, and coffin plaque of Elizabeth Habsburg, and the crown, sceptre, orb, three rings, chain, and two coffin plaques of Barbara Radziwiłł. Their exact location was figured out by heritage researcher Saulius Poderis.

== Religious, social, and cultural activities ==
A mass in the Archcathedral

Marriage ceremony in the Archcathedral

Baptism ceremony in the Archcathedral

Religious services at the Archcathedral reflect the Vilnius's profound spiritual life and uphold centuries-old Catholic liturgical traditions. Since 1388 the Cathedra of the Bishops of Vilnius and the Archbishops of Vilnius (since the 20th century) is located in the Archcathedral. Moreover, historically in 1388–1949 the Cathedral chapter served as the community of higher-ranking clergy of the Cathedral belonging to the Diocese of Vilnius, however the Chapter was not restored when the Archcathedral was returned to the faithful in 1988. Instead of the Chapter the Priestly Council was established and serves as an advisory body to the Metropolitan Archbishop of Vilnius. In addition, the Pastoral Council and Economic Council operates in the Archcathedral, which is an assistant council to the clergy. Furthermore, the Archcathedral also is a parish church of the Parish of St. Stanislaus and St. Ladislaus, while the parishioners of it may be Catholics based on the territorial principle or by participating in its community life, but living in other parishes territories.

The church services in the Archcathedral are held mainly in the Lithuanian language and once a week in Latin language. On Sundays, the main Holy Masses in Lithuanian are celebrated at the High Altar several times throughout the day – from early morning (8:00 a.m.) until evening (5:30 p.m.), notably including a mass for children (from 11.15 a.m.) and the Suma (High Mass) dedicated to the parish (from 12.30 a.m.), while on Sunday evenings from 5:30 p.m. a mass in Latin is held. On weekdays and Saturdays, services in Lithuanian are held in mornings from 8:00 a.m., middays from 12:30 a.m., and evenings from 5:30 p.m. The parishioners may request a priest to hold a Holy Mass in the Archcathedral for a certain intention (e.g. a specific person). Moreover, the prayers of adoration for priests is held every Thursday at 6:00 p.m. in the Archcathedral, which was initiated by Audrys Bačkis, a Cardinal and Archbishop Emeritus of Vilnius.

The liturgy at the Archcathedral is further enriched by the sound of the organ and choral singing, which during masses create a deep spiritual atmosphere that draws together local parishioners, pilgrims from afar, and visitors to the city seeking a spiritual atmosphere. The formation of the Parish Choir was initiated in 1991 by the Archcathedral's parish priest monsignor Kazimieras Vasiliauskas and since 1992 the Parish Choir sign during masses by the organ Lithuanian authors and foreign authors hymns, as well as larger works. Furthermore, other choirs also perform at certain times in the Archcathedral: the Folk Hymn Choir, which sing folk hymns during masses on the benches located near the former pulpit, the Youth Choir, which is a choir composed mostly of young singers and which sings at Sunday masses starting at 12:30 p.m., the Family Choir, which perform during the Sunday masses dedicated for children, the Chamber Choir, also known as the Grand Choir of the Vilnius Archcathedral Basilica, which perform not only during the Archcathedral's masses, but also perform separate concert programs in other Vilnian venues and other cities, towns, as well as the Schola Gregoriana Vilnensis, which perform Gregorian chants in Latin during masses.

In addition to traditional Holy Masses, the faithful are regularly invited to participate in other devotional practices, such as the Adoration of the Blessed Sacrament on Thursdays from 6:00 a.m., the recitation of the Rosary near the High Altar on Wednesdays from 5:00 a.m., the Chaplet of Divine Mercy, as well as the devotion of the Stations of the Cross on every Friday of Lent by the Stations of the Cross hung in the Archcathedral, and the devotion of the Plaintive Weepings on every Sunday after the mass of 12:30 p.m. during Lent near the High Altar, with the participation of various choirs. Furthermore, regularly Baptism, Eucharist, Confirmation, contrition, marriage, the Sacrament of the Anointing of the Sick, the Sacrament of Holy Orders, blessings of homes and other religious items (e.g. religious paintings, devotional medals, candles, Christian crosses), funeral ceremonies are held in the Archcathedral or if necessary by Archcathedral's priests personally visiting people. Moreover, every year in late November or early December a Nativity scene is being set up in the Cathedral Square and on the night of December 24–25 the Midnight Mass is held in the Archcathedral following which a sculpture of Jesus is carried by a religious procession from the Archatedral to the Nativity scene of Cathedral Square and the scene is being consecrated under the leadership of Metropolitan Archbishop of Vilnius.

Furthermore, a mass in the Archcathedral is one of the traditional parts of the inauguration ceremonies of the elected President of Lithuania. The Archcathedral is also used for the state funeral procedures of the deceased President of Lithuania.

Wake ceremony for the commanders and participants of the January Uprising

On November 22, 2019, in the Archcathedral a state funeral's wake ceremony was held for the commanders Zygmunt Sierakowski, Konstanty Kalinowski and other participants of the January Uprising, whose remains were secretly filled up by the soldiers of the Imperial Russian Army on the nearby Castle Hill and later discovered in 2019. The historic event was attended by many incumbent Lithuanian and foreign statesman, namely the Lithuanian President Gitanas Nausėda and Polish President Andrzej Duda with their wives First Ladies, the Speaker of the Seimas, Viktoras Pranckietis, the Polish Prime Minister Mateusz Morawiecki, as well as the Vice Prime Minister of Ukraine, Dmytro Kuleba, the Deputy Prime Minister of Belarus, Igor Petrishenko, the Deputy Prime Minister of Latvia, Jānis Bordāns, and also other Lithuanian and foreign statesman and clergy.

Special masses are held annually in the Archcathedral dedicated to certain public holidays in Lithuania. Annually on February 16 a mass is being held commemorating the adoption of the Act of Independence of Lithuania by the Council of Lithuania on February 16, 1918. Likewise, annually on March 11 a mass is being held commemorating the adoption of the Act of the Re-Establishment of the State of Lithuania by the Supreme Council – Reconstituent Seimas on March 11, 1990. Moreover, annually on July 6 a mass is being held commemorating the Statehood Day, which is celebrating the coronation of the first Lithuanian King Mindaugas in 1253 and the national anthem of Lithuania.

The Diaconia services are also organized by the Archcathedral, namely through the branch of the Caritas Internationalis operating there and Archcathedral's priests visits of sick people.

One of the highlights of cultural events organized at the Archcathedral are the concert series Voice of the Cathedral Organ (Lithuanian: Katedros vargonų balsas; Latin: Vox organi Cathedralis) during which Lithuanian and foreign organists perform renowned musical works of Lithuanian (e.g. Mikalojus Konstantinas Čiurlionis) and foreign composers over a span of several months. Moreover, other cultural events, as well as historical and educational tours are organized regularly in the Archcathedral's buildings and basements. Nevertheless, the tourist tours are not permitted inside the Archcathedral during religious services, in order to maintain an atmosphere of reverence and focused prayer.

== Treasury ==
Reliquary of Saint Stanislaus, c. 14th-15th c.

The Treasury of Vilnius Archcathedral is the oldest and the most extensive preserved collection of religious art in the entire former territory of the Grand Duchy of Lithuania. A part of the treasury was lost due to the unfavorable historical events (e.g. wars, fires), however in total 988 historic objects of the treasury were preserved and some objects are still used in Archcathedral's liturgy, while other objects are exhibited at the Church Heritage Museum, located in the Church of St. Michael. The treasury objects reflects the evolution of Lithuanian statehood, Christian culture in Lithuania and goldsmithing, silversmithing over a span of more than six centuries. It consists of liturgical vessels and other accessories (e.g. crosses, candlesticks), paintings, sculptures, books, and textile products (e.g. vestments, Flemish tapestries). Many objects were donated to the treasury by the Lithuanian nobility and foreign nobles, clergy, monarchs.

The treasury began to be collected in the Cathedral since its establishment in the late 14th century. The oldest objects of the treasury, both dating to at least the late 14th century, are ivory portable altarpiece (diptych), presumably donated to the Cathedral by Grand Duke Jogaila, and silver ceremonial staff (stipula) of a prelate cantor, which was restored in the mid-16th century. Moreover, a late 14th century – early 15th century hand form reliquary with St. Stanislaus's hand bone was preserved, which was gifted to the Vilnius Cathedral by the Chapter of Wawel Cathedral commemorating its founding. Furthermore, the Lithuania's oldest surviving chalice was manufactured in Gdańsk in the 15th century and is a part of the treasury.

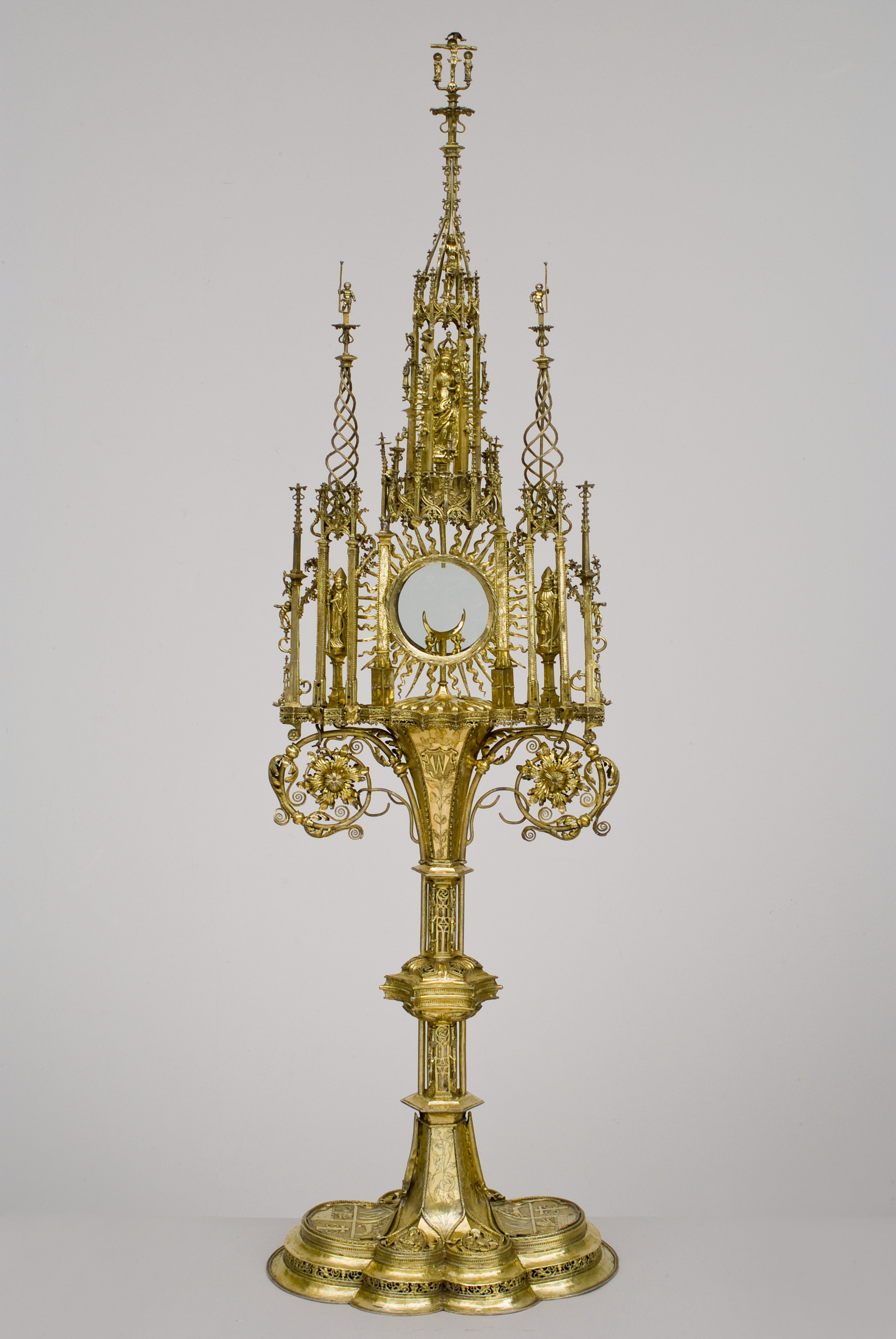
In the left side: The Great Monstrance, commissioned in 1535 by Albertas Goštautas; in the right side: monstrance of Jerzy Tyszkiewicz.

The exceptionally notable objects of the treasury dating to the first half of the 16th century are attributed to Albertas Goštautas, Grand Chancellor of Lithuania and Voivode of Vilnius, who in 1535 donated the Great Monstrance, decorated with saints sculptures, including St. Casimir, to the Hyeranyony Church, however later in 1698 it was transferred to the Vilnius Cathedral, and also Goštautas donated a crystal cross of nearly a metre height, manufactured in 1539 and decorated with gilded silver and precious stones, to which later relics of Saint Pope Eutychian were added. Other highly valuable 16th-century object of the treasury is a 16th-century chalice, which was donated to the Cathedral by Jerzy Radziwiłł, Bishop of Vilnius and Cardinal.

Moreover, Ewa Gosiewska and her daughter Helena Sanguszko in 1637 donated to the Cathedral a partly gilded silver reliquary of St. Casimir, which is based on the works of Giacomo Lauro. Subsequently, Bogusław Korwin Gosiewski, a relative of Ewa Gosiewska, donated to the Cathedral a similar reliquary of St. Stanislaus and ornate monstrance in the early 18th century. Both these reliquaries of St. Casimir and St. Stanislaus stand in the Archcathedral's High Altar. Other notable 17th-century object of the treasury is a chalice, which was manufactured between 1649–1655 and donated by Jerzy Tyszkiewicz, Bishop of Vilnius.

In the mid-17th century the treasury suffered massive damages when the invading Army of the Tsardom of Russia captured a large part of the treasury which was attempted to be evacuated with ships to Königsberg and many old valuables were lost. Other part of the treasury was initially hidden in Samogitia, later transported to the Ruzhany Palace and the Jasna Góra Monastery in Częstochowa, therefore a part of the treasury's valuables were preserved throughout the war and returned to the Vilnius Cathedral in 1667.

In the left side: Reliquary of Saint Mary Magdalene de' Pazzi, 1682; in the right side: chalice, donated to the Cathedral by Mikołaj Stefan Pac in 1683.

The ornate reliquary with Saint Mary Magdalene de' Pazzi's tooth and hair, which was manufactured in Giovanni Battista Comparini and Giuseppe Vanni workshop in Florence in 1682, was acquired in the late 17th century by Mikołaj Stefan Pac, Bishop of Vilnius, when Cosimo III de' Medici, Grand Duke of Tuscany, sent it to Pac demonstrating his gratitude for Pac's previously sent to him femur of St. Casimir, and following Pac's death in 1684 it became the Cathedral's property. In addition, Mikołaj Stefan Pac soon before his death in 1683 donated to the Cathedral a chalice, decorated with enamel painting and precious stones.

Notable among preserved objects of the treasury dating to the 19th century is a decorative gilded silver chalice, which was donated in 1854 to the Cathedral by Michał Tyszkiewicz, Graf of Biržai.

Just before the outbreak of World War II, the most valuable parts of the treasury were hidden in Archcathedral's walls in 1939. This part of the treasury was discovered in 1985, however its finders (e.g. Romualdas Budrys, Napaleonas Kitkauskas) securely hidden the valuables elsewhere until 1989 – 1990s as they thought that the Soviet authorities might seek to transport these valuables from Lithuania. Since 1989 some items of the treasury were used in the Archcathedral's liturgy, while all the remaining objects were returned to the Archdiocese of Vilnius in 2006.

In 1993, Pope John Paul II during his visit to Lithuania personally donated to the Archcathedral a golden chalice with a golden paten, both of which were manufactured in the St. Peter's Basilica's workshop in Vatican City.

== Gallery ==
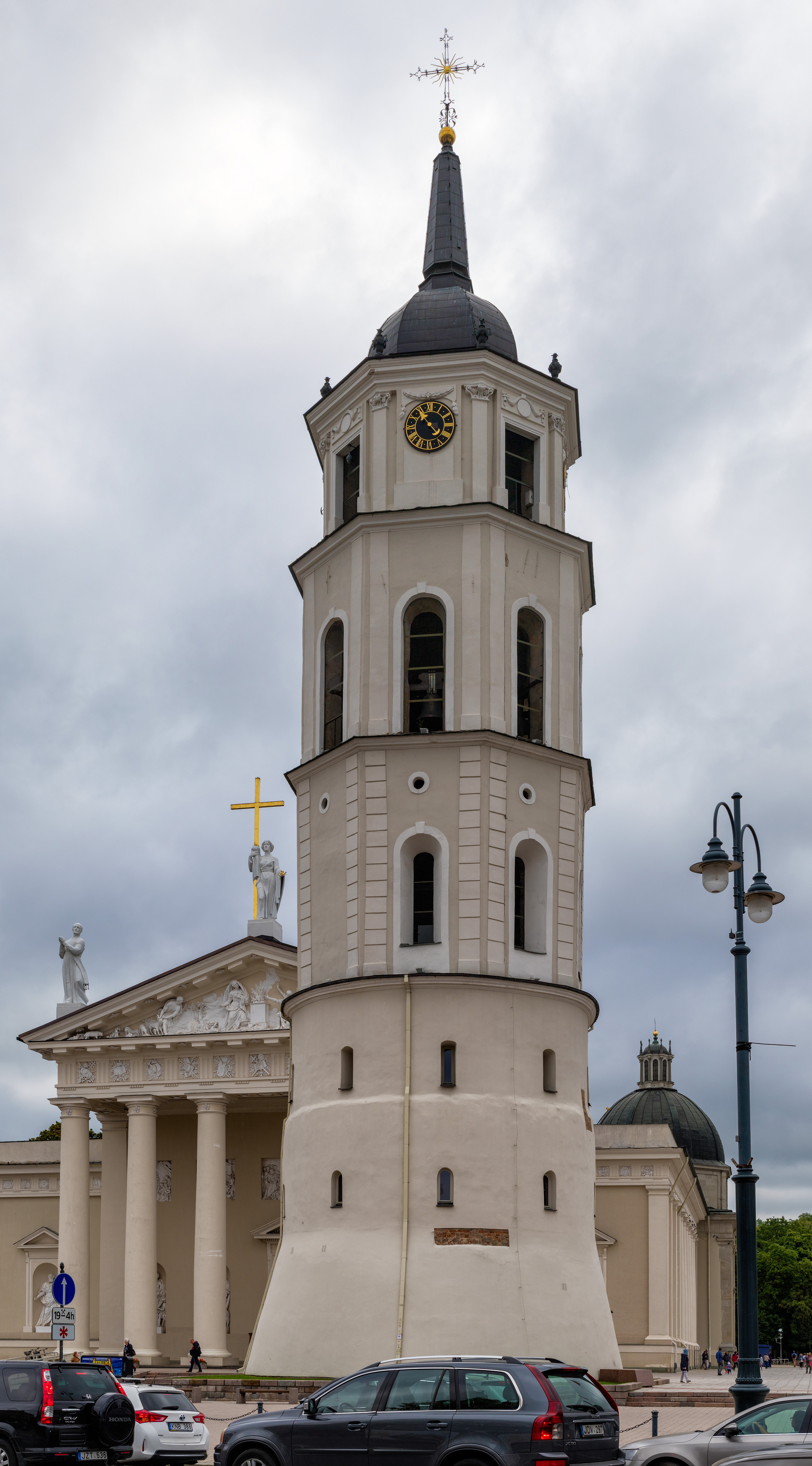
The Bell Tower

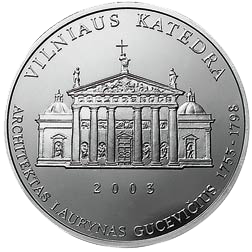
Litas coin to commemorate Vilnius Cathedral

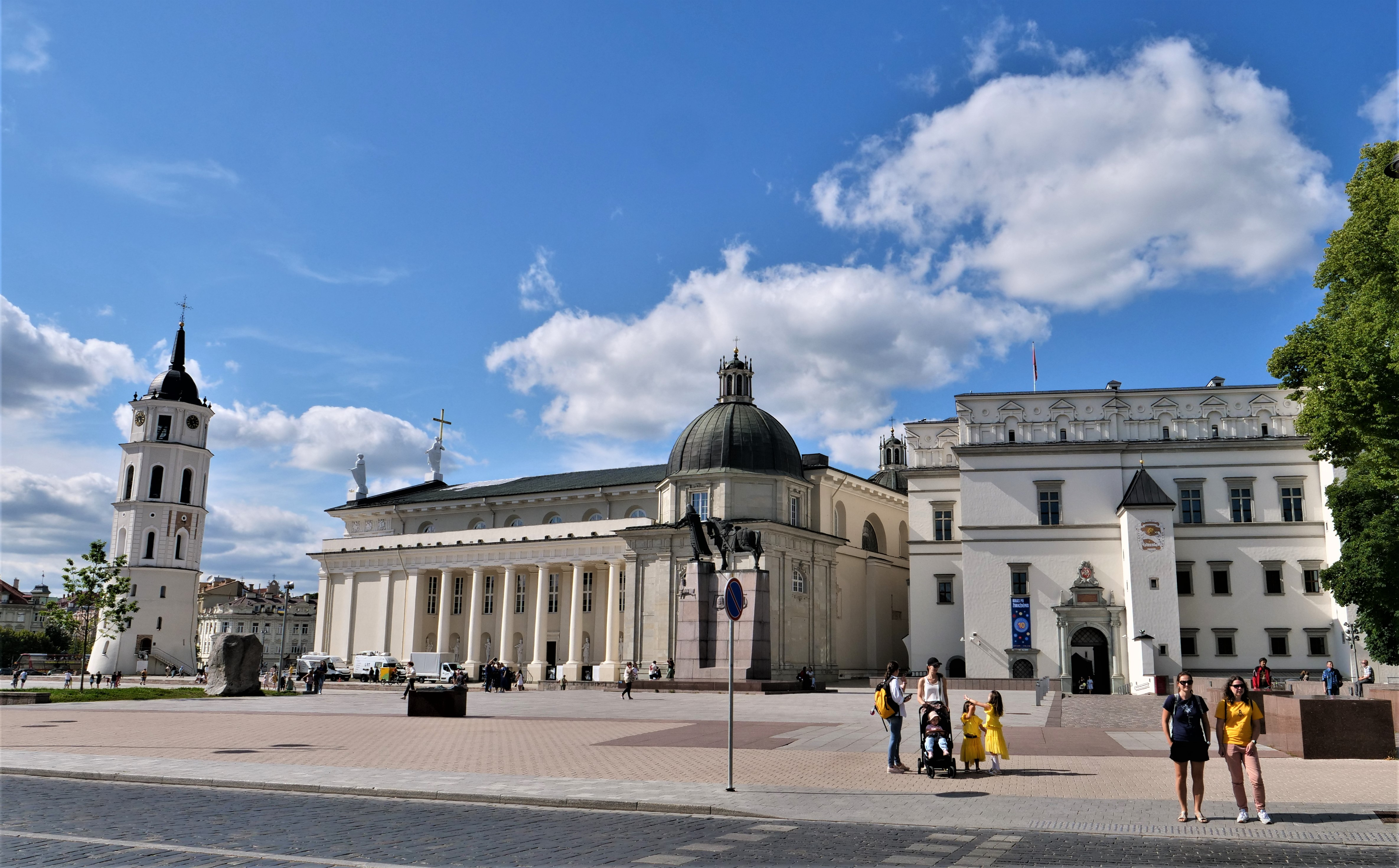
Side view of Vilnius Cathedral

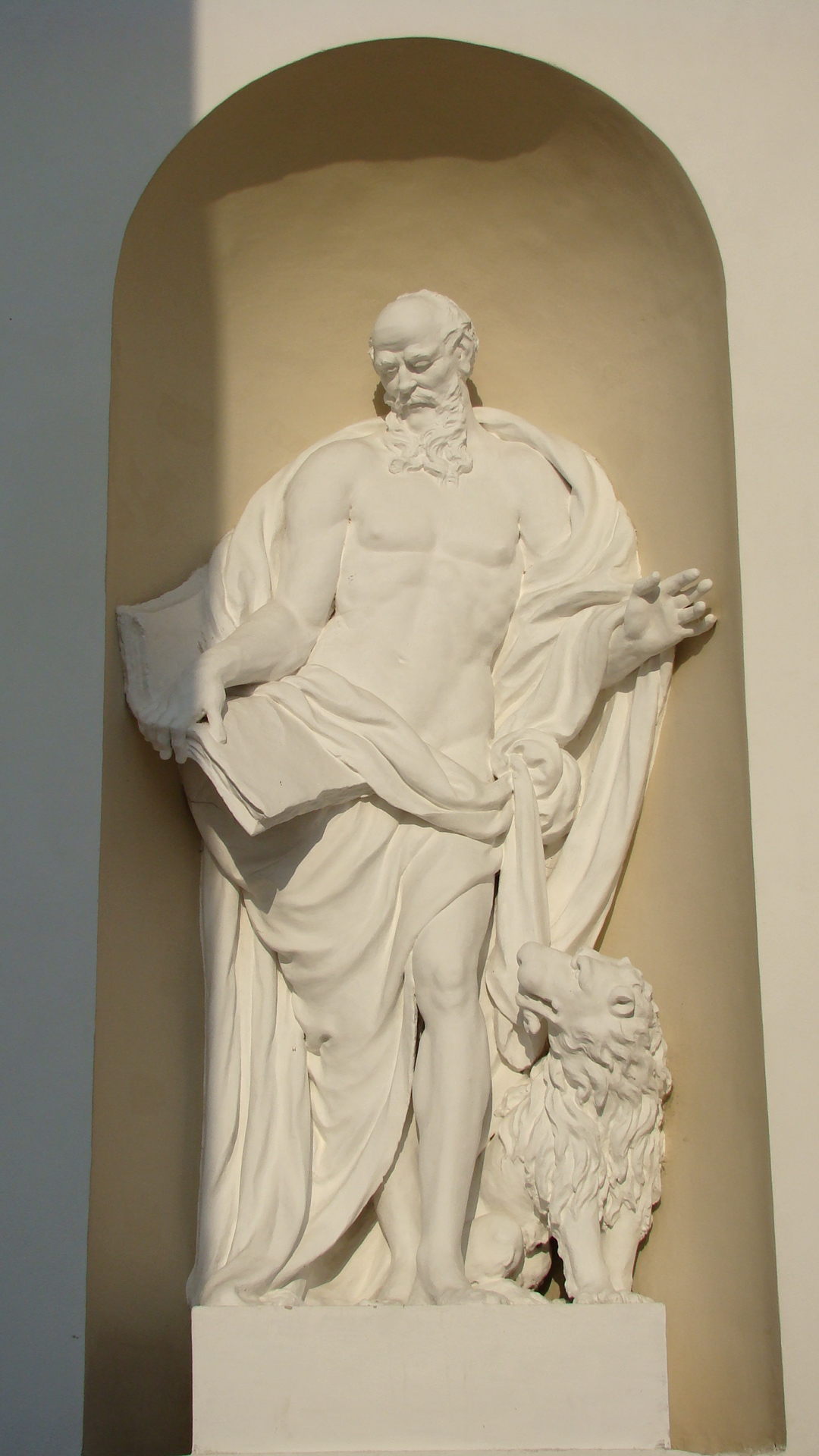
Statue of apostle Mark

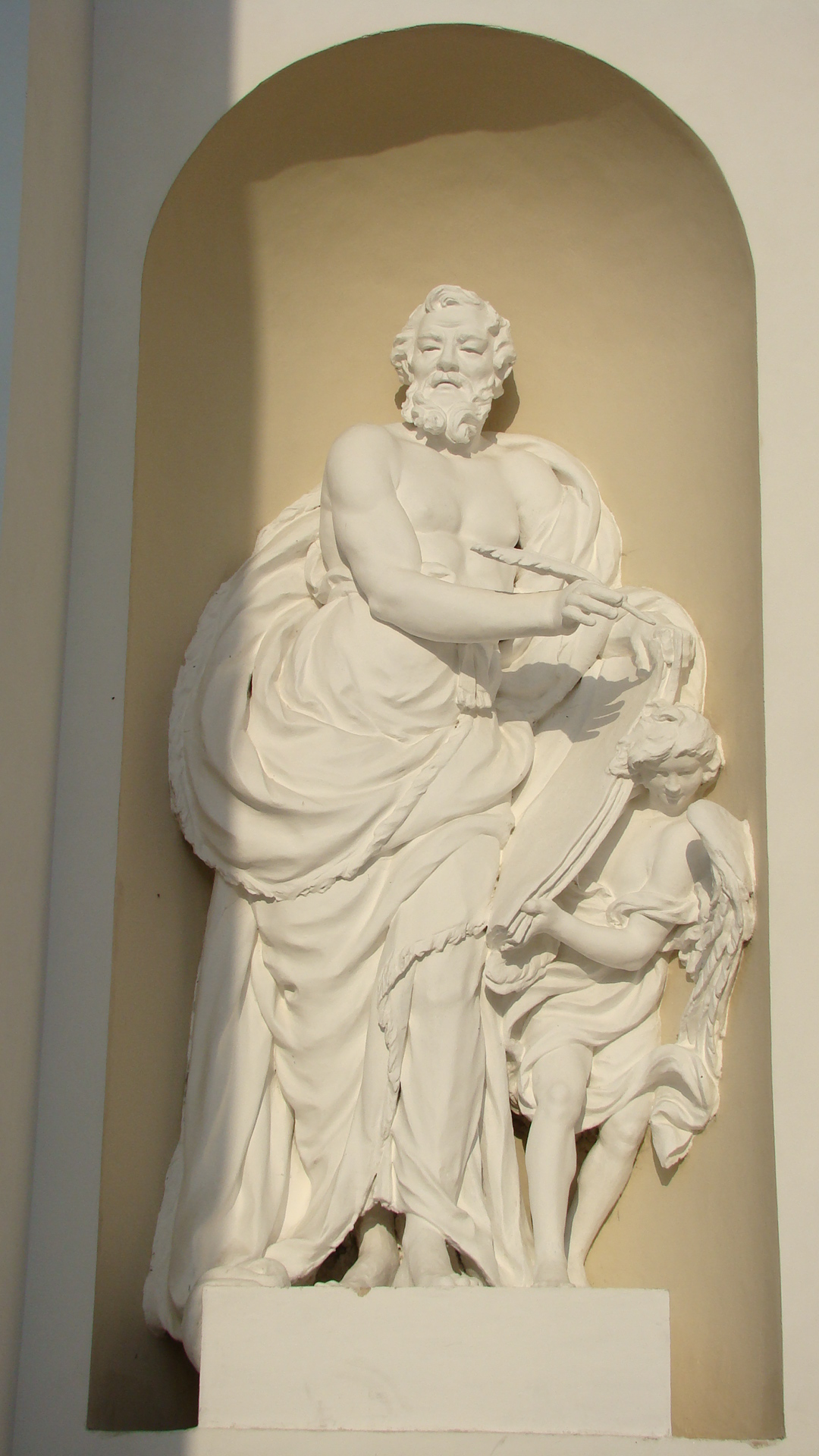
Statue of apostle Matthew

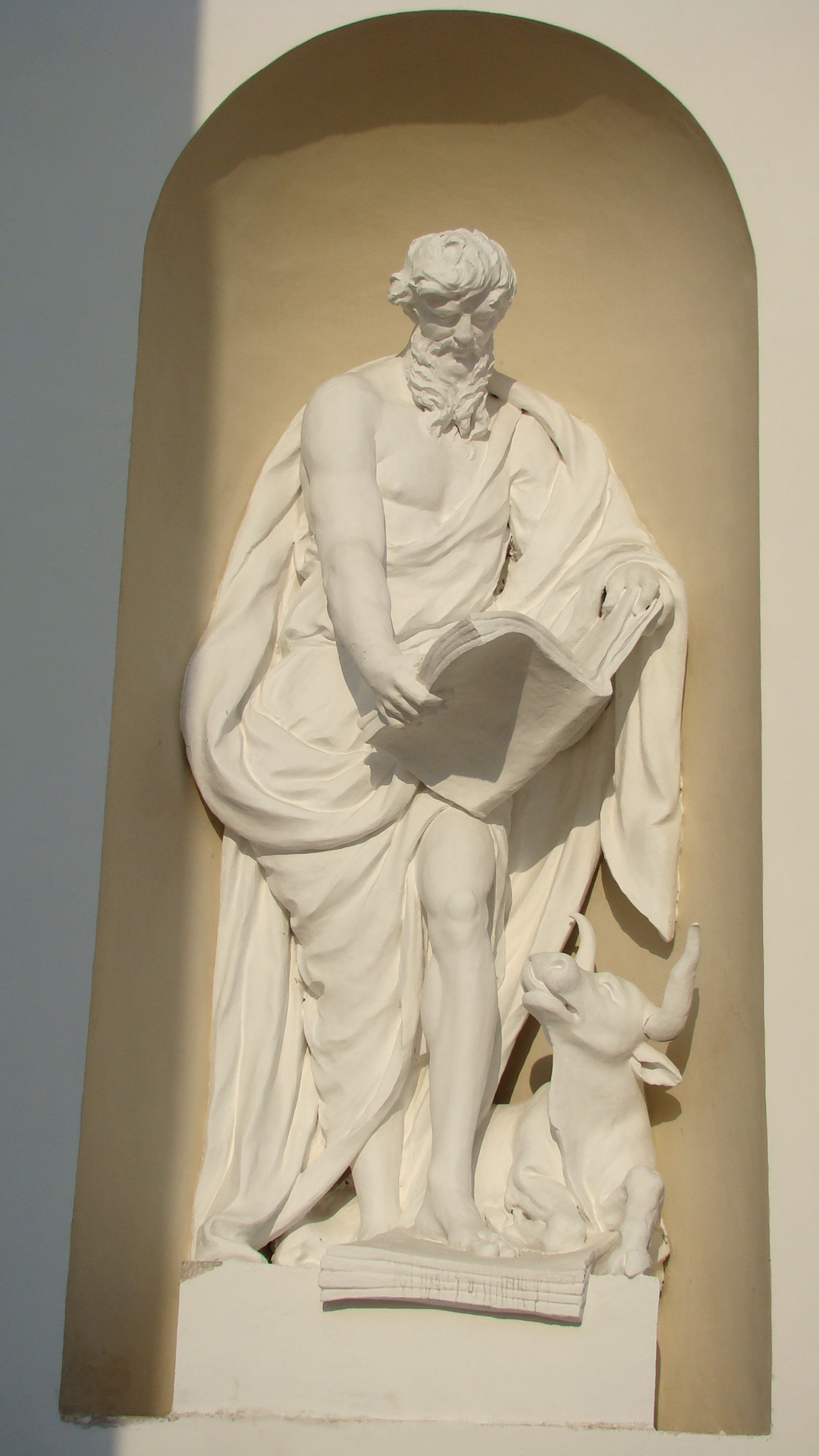
Statue of apostle Luke

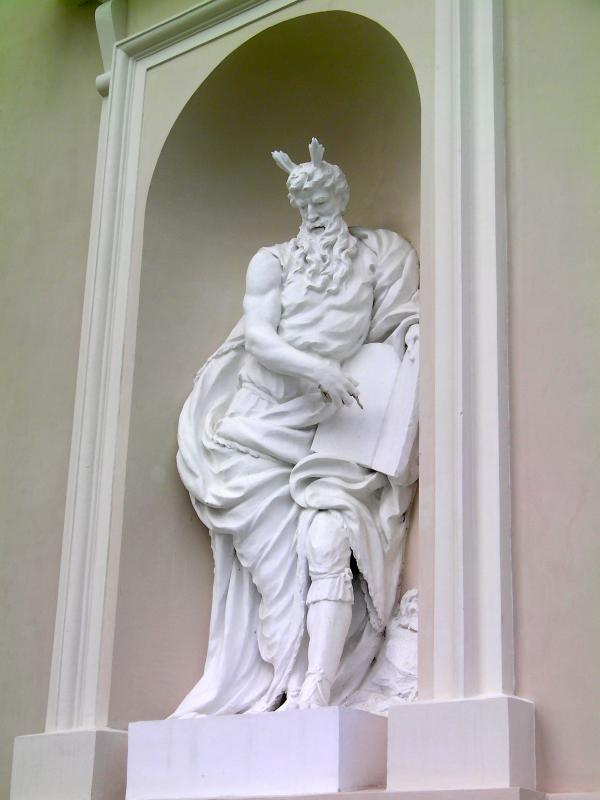
Statue of Moses

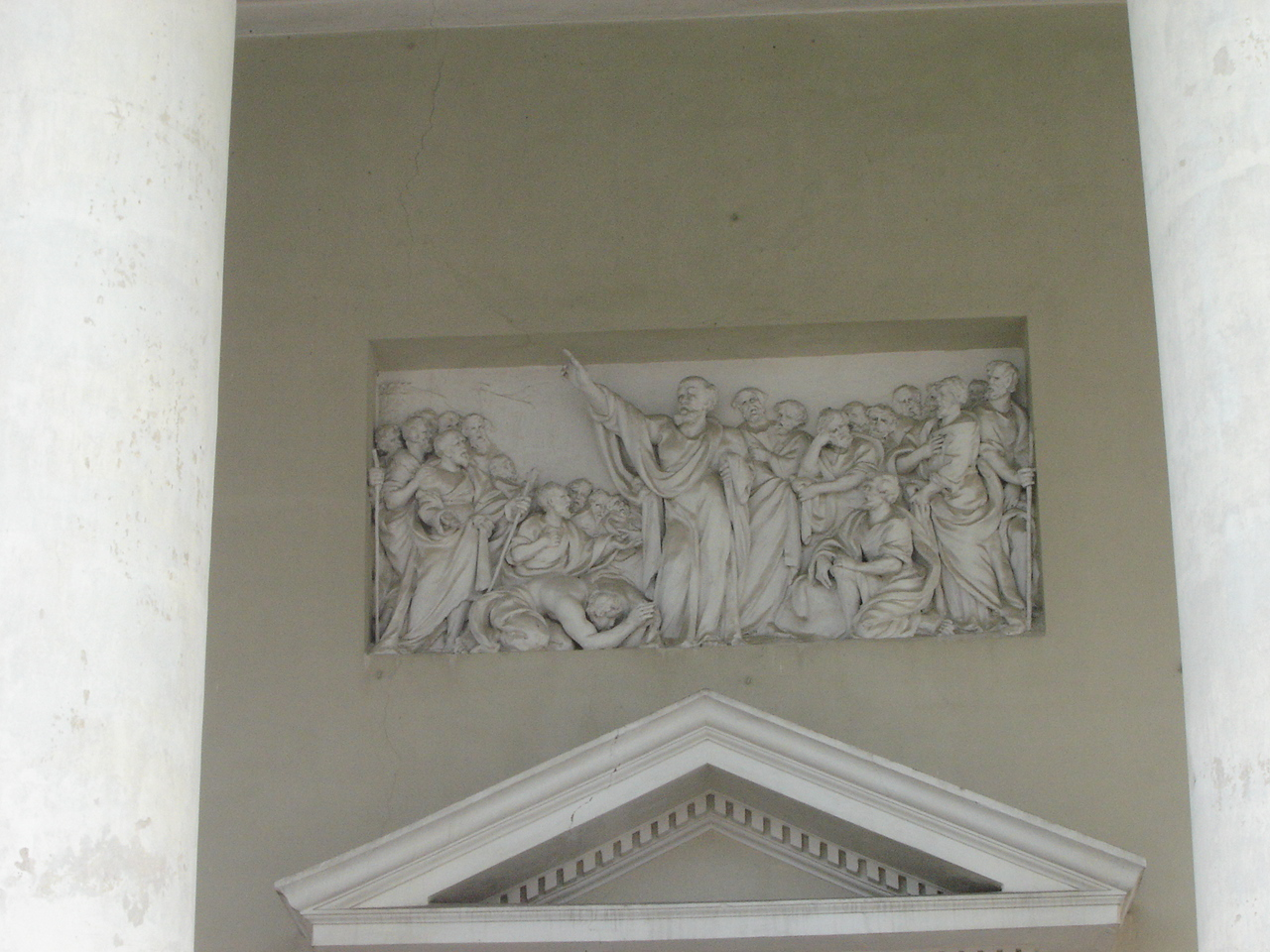
Bas-relief composition, located above the main central doors, depicting Saint Peter addressing a crowd

== See also ==
- List of churches in Vilnius
- Catholic Church in Lithuania

== Bibliography ==
- Janicki, Marek A. (2020). "Grób i komemoracja wielkiego księcia Aleksandra Witolda w katedrze wileńskiej w kontekście upamiętnienia Władysława Jagiełły w katedrze krakowskiej i propagandy jagiellońskiej XIV–XVI w." [The tomb and commemoration of Grand Duke Alexander Vytautas in Vilnius Cathedral in the context of the commemoration of Władysław Jagiełło in Kraków Cathedral and Jagiellonian propaganda in the fourteenth–sixteenth centuries]. Przegląd Historyczny (in Polish). 111 (4): 769–814.
- Mikocka-Rachubowa, Katarzyna (2019). "Rzeźby katedry wileńskiej i ich twórca Tommaso Righi" [The Sculptures of Vilnius Cathedral and Their Creator Tommaso Righi]. Biuletyn Historii Sztuki (in Polish). 81 (2): 197–220. doi:10.36744/bhs.316.
