= Samuel Pac =

Polish–Lithuanian nobleman, politician and magnate

- Grand Standard Bearer of Lithuania
- Epitaph of Samuel Pac in the Vilnius Archcathedral with his bust
- Coat of arms: Gozdawa
- Born: January 18, 1590
- Died: 1627 (aged 36–37); Vilnius, Grand Duchy of Lithuania, Polish–Lithuanian Commonwealth
- Noble family: Pac
- Father: Mikołaj Pac
- Mother: Zofia Agata Sapieżanka

Samuel Pac (Lithuanian: Samuelis Pacas; 1590–1627 in Vilnius) was a Lithuanian noble from the House of Pac. He was a Colonel of the Army of the Grand Duchy of Lithuania and also served as the Grand Standard Bearer of Lithuania, and participated in multiple prominent military battles.

== Biography ==
Stefan was a son of Mikołaj Pac, Chamberlain of Brest, and a brother of Stefan Pac, Grand Treasurer of Lithuania.

He held the military ranks of rittmaster and colonel of the Army of the Grand Duchy of Lithuania. Since 1623 he also served as the Grand Standard Bearer of Lithuania.

He personally participated in successful battles fought by the armies of Lithuania and Poland, namely the Battle of Kircholm in 1605 versus the Kingdom of Sweden, also the Siege of Smolensk in 1609–1611 versus the Tsardom of Russia and Kingdom of Sweden, as well as the Battle of Khotyn in 1621 versus the Ottoman Empire and its allies.

He died from an acute fever on January 18, 1590, in Vilnius, Grand Duchy of Lithuania. In his honor an epitaph attributed to Costante Tencalla was erected in the south aisle of Vilnius Cathedral between 1629 and 1633, which combines black and reddish-brown marble with limestone and feature his bust, as well as in its memorial plaque in Latin his statesman, military career is described and it is also mentioned that he was injured in the fought battles.

== See also ==
- Lithuanian nobility
