= Kalesninkai Eldership =

Eldership of Lithuania

The Kalesninkai Eldership (Lithuanian: Kalesninkų seniūnija) is an eldership of Lithuania, located in the Šalčininkai District Municipality. In 2021 its population was 1638.
