= Church of Jesus the Redeemer, Vilnius =

Roman Catholic church in Vilnius, Lithuania

Church of Jesus the Redeemer
- Švč. Jėzaus Atpirkėjo bažnyčia (Lithuanian)
- The main façade of the church

Religion
- Affiliation: Roman Catholic
- Diocese: Archdiocese of Vilnius
- Ecclesiastical or organisational status: Active
- Year consecrated: 1756

Location
- Location: Vilnius, Lithuania
- Interactive map of Church of Jesus the Redeemer
- Coordinates: 54°42′01.80″N 25°18′44.70″E

Architecture
- Architects: Giovanni Pietro Perti, Stanislovas Narockis
- Type: Church
- Style: Baroque, Rococo
- Founder: Jan Kazimierz Sapieha the Younger, Trinitarians
- Groundbreaking: 1694
- Completed: 1717

Specifications
- Height (max): 34-metre (112 ft)
- Materials: Plastered masonry, stucco, marble, metals

The Church of Jesus the Redeemer (Lithuanian: Švč. Jėzaus Atpirkėjo bažnyčia) (Note: The Church is also known as Vilnius' Church of the Redeemer (Lithuanian: Vilniaus Išganytojo bažnyčia), Vilnius' Church of Lord Jesus (Lithuanian: Vilniaus Viešpaties Jėzaus bažnyčia; Polish: Kościół Pana Jezusa) or Vilnius' Trinitarian Church (Lithuanian: Vilniaus Trinitorių bažnyčia).) is a Roman Catholic church in the Antakalnis eldership in Vilnius, Lithuania. It was founded by the Lithuanian Grand Hetman and Voivode of Vilnius, Jan Kazimierz Sapieha the Younger, and the Trinitarians in 1694. Its architect is Pietro Perti, who is also the author of the nearby Church of St. Peter and St. Paul. The church, Trinitarian Monastery and the Sapieha Palace with its park constitutes a magnificent Baroque ensemble. At the time of construction its cupola was considered the largest in the Grand Duchy of Lithuania.

== History ==
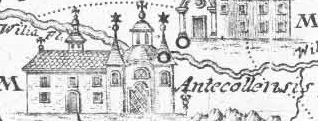
Fragment of a 1748 map with the church and the monastery

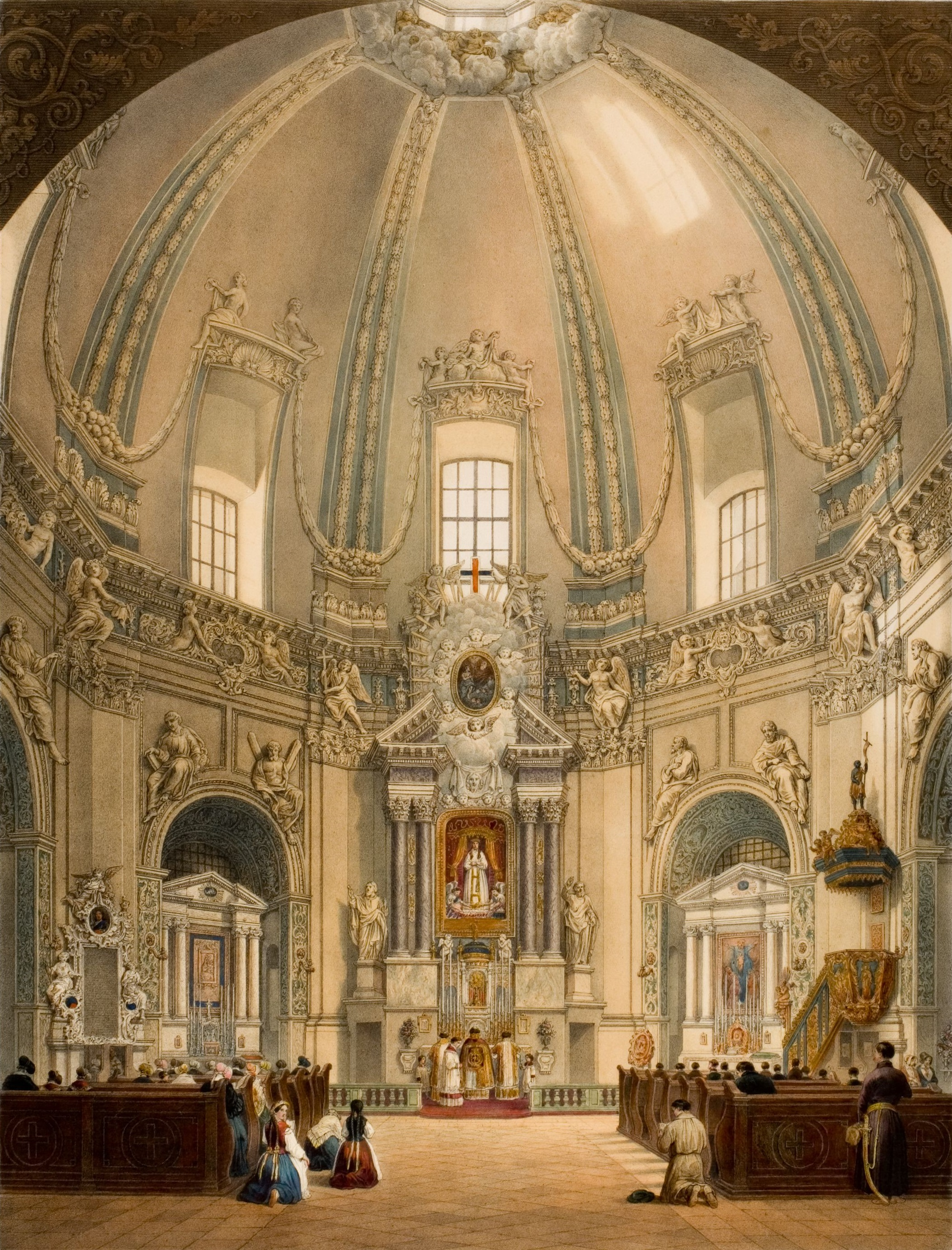
Interior of the church in 1847

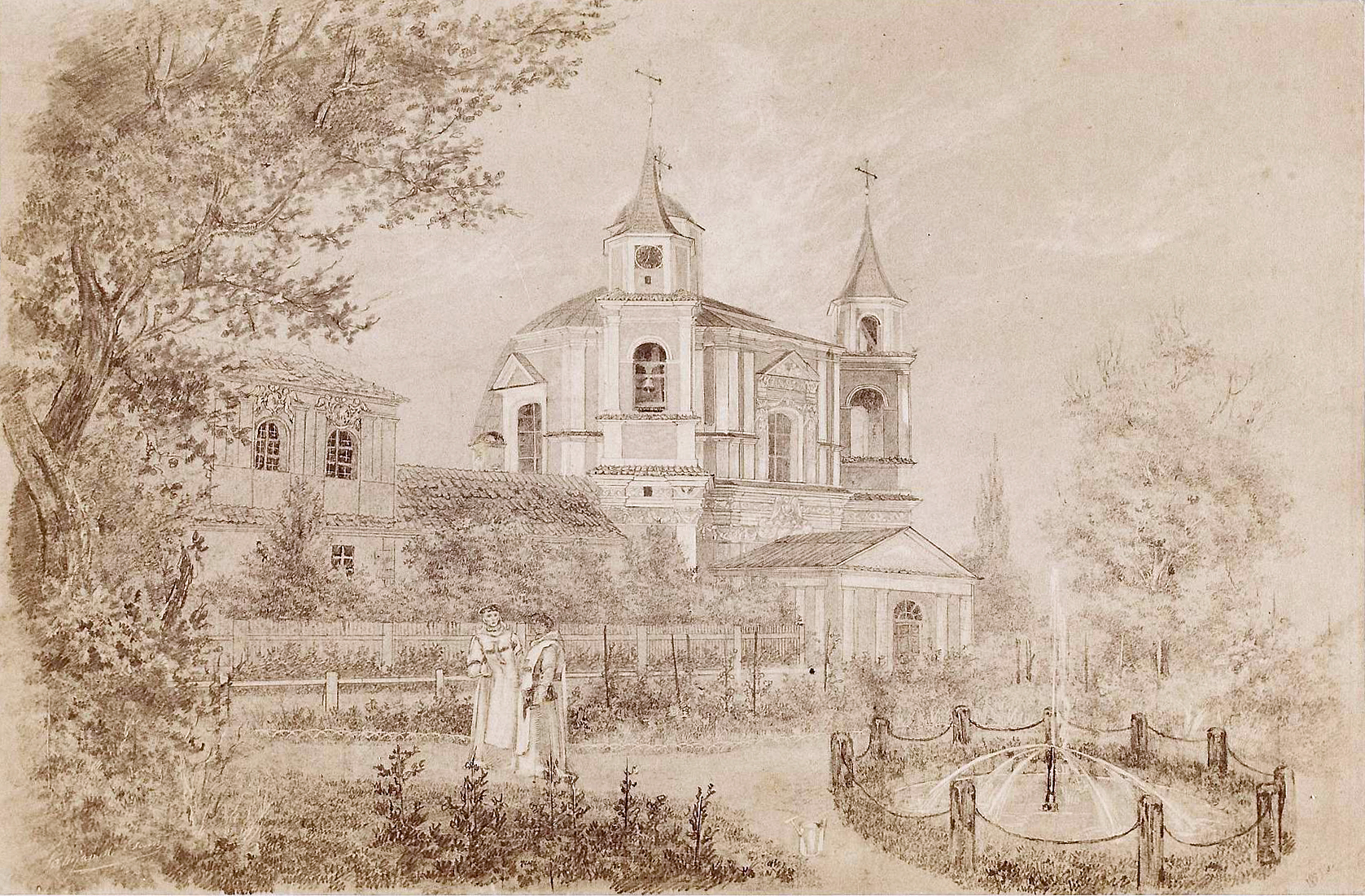
The church in 1851

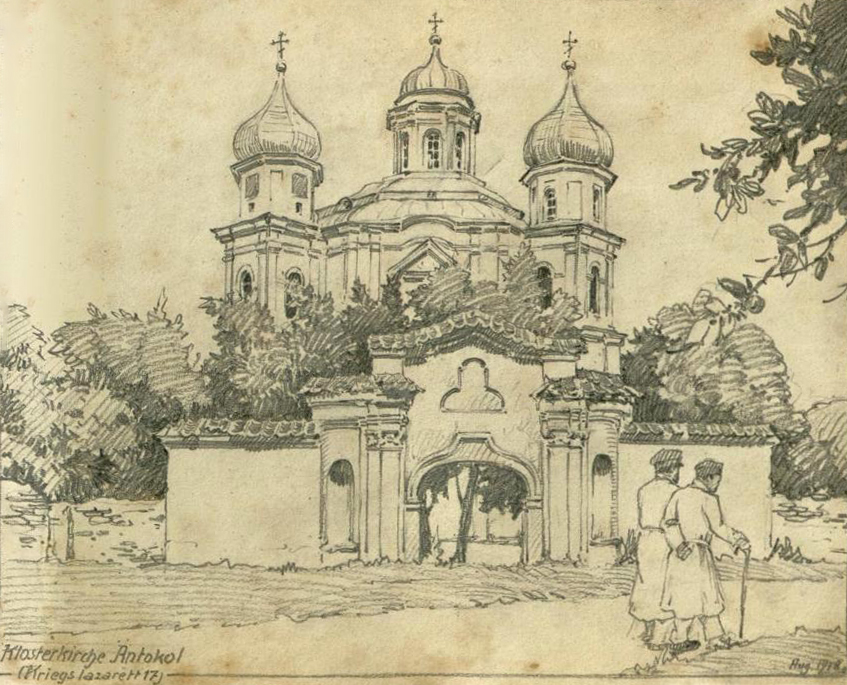
The church after the Orthodox style 19th century reconstruction

In 1693, Kazimierz Jan Sapieha, Voivode of Vilnius, invited Trinitarians to Vilnius from Spain and their community was established in Antakalnis. In 1694, under the supervision of architect Stanislovas Narockis began the construction of the architect Giovanni Pietro Perti's designed Baroque style masonry church within the grounds of the Sapieha Palace and it was completed in 1717.

The church, together with the Trinitarian Monastery and the Sapieha Palace, formed a magnificent ensemble in Antakalnis. The decoration of the church continued until 1756 and in the same year the completed sanctuary was consecrated by Bishop Tomas Zenkevičius in the name of the Holy Trinity and the Most Holy Redeemer.

Between 1700 and 1705, the church's interior was adorned with elaborate stucco ornamentation by the Italian architect, sculptor Giovanni Pietro Perti, who had previously worked at the Church of St. Peter and St. Paul. The focal point of the church was a miraculous statue of Jesus the Nazarene, brought from Rome in 1700 and modeled after a miraculous Ecce homo sculpture kept in Madrid, Spain. The interior was also embellished with three valuable paintings by the artist Franciszek Smuglewicz. Following Perti's departure, the decoration of the church was continued by several other artists, who continued working within the Baroque tradition. In 1716, upon the completion of the initial interior outfitting, the Bishop of Vilnius, Konstanty Kazimierz Brzostowski, consecrated the sanctuary under the title of the Most Holy Jesus the Redeemer. Although construction and decorative works continued until 1717, this consecration marked the official commencement of the Trinitarians' activities in the newly built sanctuary.

In 1734, crypts were constructed in the church cellars for the burial of members of the Sapieha family, thereby establishing the sanctuary as a family mausoleum. In 1744, a Rococo style funerary monument was erected in the church, becoming a significant artistic feature of the interior.

Following the completion of the church's interior decorative work in 1756, the church was reconsecrated under the titles of the Most Holy Trinity, the Most Holy Redeemer Jesus the Nazarene, and the Nativity of the Blessed Virgin Mary. Two massive, four-sided towers, topped with tapering octagonal spires, were added to the front of the church. During this period, the appearance of the Late Baroque ensemble took its final form, and the church became a significant spiritual center in Antakalnis, renowned for its miraculous statue of Jesus the Nazarene and its exceptional architecture.

During the French invasion of Russia in 1812 the interiors of the church and nearby monastery were damaged by soldiers of the Grande Armée.

After the suppression of the anti-Russian January Uprising in 1864, the Russian authorities closed the nearby Trinitarian Monastery, while the church was converted into the Orthodox Church of St. Michael the Archangel. During this period, the building was severely damaged: the vaults of the second floor were demolished, the ceilings were raised, the central High Altar was removed, the Rococo style pulpit was destroyed, the Catholic style caps of the church's towers and cupola were replaced with onion domes and a porch was added, obscuring the portal, and destroyed a monument of the founder's son Aleksander Paweł Sapieha, Grand Marshal of Lithuania.

In 1918, the church was returned to the Catholics, while the Trinitarian Monastery buildings were handed over to the clinics of Vilnius University. In 1924, the church interior was restored and the original form of the roof lantern and the tower caps was reinstated. The restoration work was carried out and supervised by the artist Jerzy Hoppen.

During the Soviet period the church was seized from the Catholics and converted it into a military warehouse, which again resulted in damages to it.

In 1993, the Trinitarian Monastery complex was renovated, and the St. Joseph Priest Seminary of Vilnius began operating there. Since 2000, the church has been served by the Brothers Hospitallers of Saint John of God and since then the complex has been known by the name of St. John the Theologian. Mindful of the damage from 1812, the French government contributed to the renovation of the complex.

== Architecture ==
=== Exterior ===
The church's façade and cupola, which at the time of construction was the largest in the entire Grand Duchy of Lithuania, and dominates the entire volume of the building

The church and monastery complex is compactly arranged within a small, nearly square site of approximately one hectare in Antakalnis. The complex consists of a church on the eastern side and four monastery wings to its west, which form an enclosed inner courtyard. This Baroque architectural complex is characterized by a strict axial composition, typical of the layout of noble residences in the Grand Duchy of Lithuania at the time.

The church is a unique, centrally planned masonry structure with a plastered exterior, dominating the entire complex. The sanctuary features an octagonal layout (a rotunda) and is crowned by a monumental 34-metre-high cupola topped with an elegant roof lantern. The cupola at the time of its construction was considered the largest in the entire Grand Duchy of Lithuania, surpassing many of the masonry religious buildings of that time. The church with its sense of lightness and subtle architectural elements is reminiscent of the famous San Carlo alle Quattro Fontane in Rome. In the mid-18th century (likely around 1756), two massive, four-sided towers with octagonal spires were added to the flanks of the main (southern) façade, while a portico with a restrained, minimalist design was incorporated at the entrance.

The most significant compositional feature of the church's main (southern) façade is an ornate double frieze, which lends the building a distinctive horizontal articulation and a sense of dynamism. Centered within this frieze, directly above the main portal, is a high relief sculptural group, which is considered one of the most expressive examples of Baroque didactic art in Vilnius.

The church's main façade sculptural group of an angel looking after two kneeling warriors bound in chains

The church's main entrance

The central figure of the church's main façade sculptural group is an angel looking after two kneeling warriors bound in chains, ransomed from Saracen captivity. This allegorical composition directly embodies the primary mission of the Trinitarian Order – Redemptio Captivorum (the redemption of Christian captives from Muslims captivity). The figures of the warriors are depicted with expressions of prayer and hope, while the angel, dominating the scene from above, symbolizes divine aid and the Order's role as an intermediary in carrying out this perilous humanitarian mission.

This sculptural group of the church's main façade not only adorns the building but also serves as architecture parlante ("speaking architecture") publicly declaring the Trinitarians' purpose to passersby. From an artistic perspective, the high relief exhibits the theatricality characteristic of the Late Baroque, a profound interplay of light and shadow, and the anatomical precision typical of the school of architect Giovanni Pietro Perti. The sculptural ensemble is framed by abundant floral motifs, which blend harmoniously with the overall decorative scheme of the entire façade.

The symmetry and vertical axis of the main (southern) façade are emphasized by a decorative portal with rigorous forms, above which is a large window for the organ loft is positioned. This window is distinguished by profiled surrounds and a triangular pediment with Classicist features, which lends a sense of completeness to the façade. All the exterior forms of the building – from the piers to the cornices – are richly decorated with high-quality stucco moldings. This ornamentation, consisting of floral motifs and architectural details, imparts a sense of plasticity and visual lightness to the monumental Baroque structure.

An important part of the complex's liturgical life consisted of three bells of varying weights, installed in the church's towers and cast during significant stages in the sanctuary's history: the largest bell, weighing ~272 kg, was cast in 1701, at the very height of the church's construction; the medium-sized bell, weighing ~84 kg, was produced in 1746, when the complex had reached its period of maturity; and the smallest bell, weighing ~56 kg, was cast in 1805 and testify to the continued attention given to the sanctuary's upkeep and liturgy right up until the monastery's closure in the mid-19th century by Russian authorities. Later new bells were installed in the church's towers.

The Trinitarian Monastery complex consists of four two-story masonry wings that are closely interconnected, enclosing a small, the-enclosed rectangular courtyard. The structure of the buildings reflects the rationality and asceticism characteristic of the Late Baroque style: the rooms within the wings are arranged in a single row, with long connecting corridors facing the courtyard providing access. The monastic cells and communal spaces are covered by massive cross vaults, which ensure structural stability, or by flat ceilings installed during later renovations. Beneath the western wing lies a spacious cellar, where the chambers are also arranged in a single row, featuring openings topped with segmental and semicircular arches.

The monastery housed an extensive library containing approximately 2,000 volumes of theological and historical works. The complex also included a cemetery, which was later officially expanded, through the efforts of the monastery superior, Inocentas Klyškovskis, and in the 19th century was designated for Catholic burials by a decision of the City Duma of Vilnius.

=== Interior ===
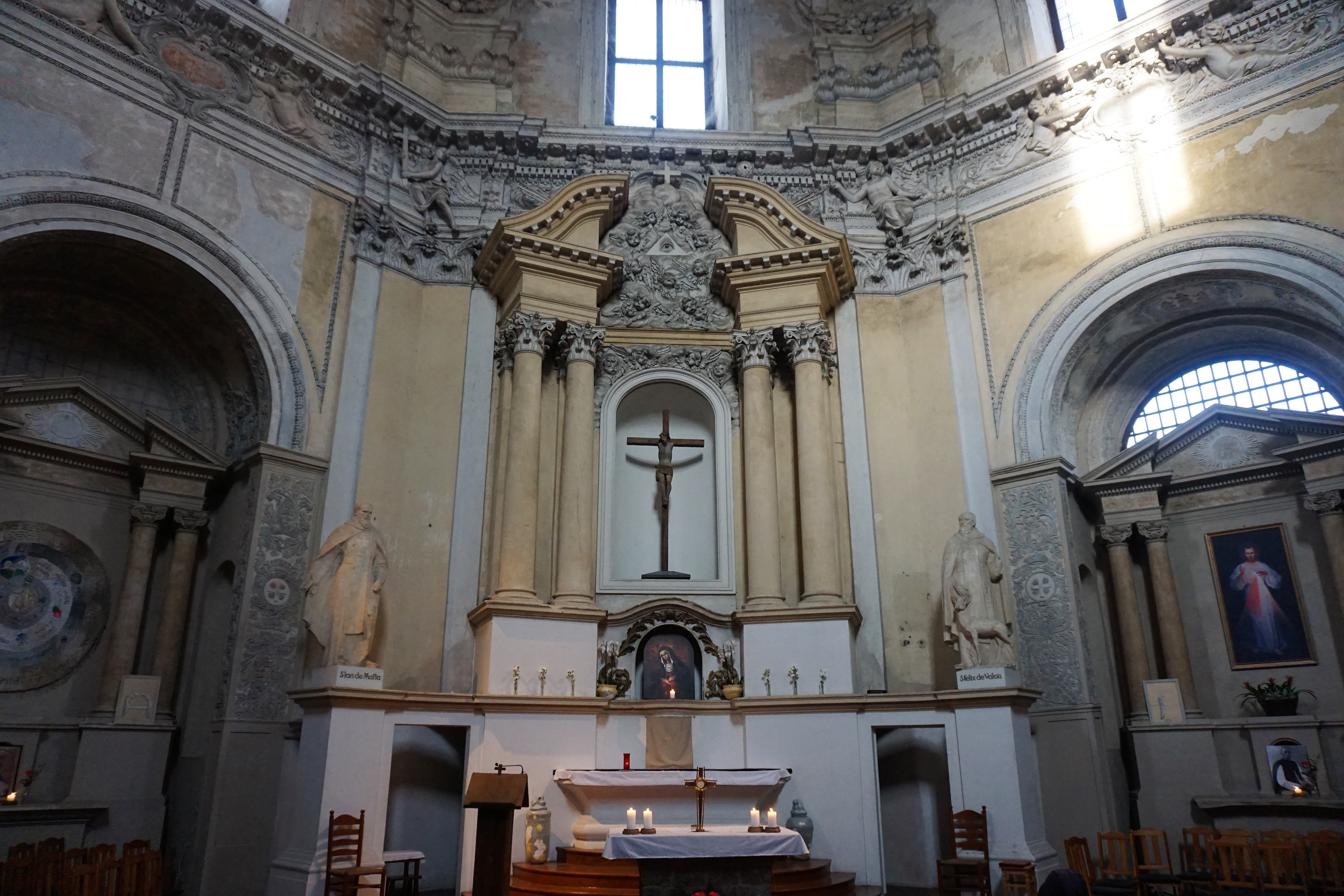
The High Altar

The cupola's interior

The organ loft

The church features a centralized, 17.5 metre × 17.5 metre octagonal plan, which creates a unified and monumental interior space. The primary compositional element of the interior is a massive octagonal cupola, rising to a height of 34 meters. The church with its sense of lightness and subtle architectural elements is reminiscent of the famous San Carlo alle Quattro Fontane in Rome.

The architectural design of the cupola is unique: the abundant and fluid sculptural decoration is arranged to completely conceal the structure of the drum from view, creating a sense of continuous upward movement. This seamless decorative unity is achieved through the masterful use of stucco: a mystical relief of clouds separates the upper part of the cupola from the roof lantern, while the eight ribs and the curvature of the vault are accentuated by expressive decorative bands, richly adorned with laurel leaf motifs and lush garlands of fruit. In the lower section of the vault, above the windows, dynamic figures and cherubs heads are integrated, visually linking the cupola to the entablature of the church's walls.

The interior of the sanctuary is richly decorated with high-quality Baroque stucco compositions, characteristic of the style of architect Giovanni Pietro Perti and the masters of his workshop. Stucco moldings of varying heights adorn the wall niches, the entablement, and the cupola. The vaults of the wall niches feature sculptural floral ornaments and scenes from the life of Jesus. The entablement is embellished with cartouches, acanthus leaves, and tulip motifs, while dynamic figures positioned above the niches accentuate the vertical articulation of the walls. Although the decoration is largely cohesive, certain elements – such as the figures of angels holding the symbols of the Passion of Jesus – are considered less expressive.

The liturgical space of the church is defined by seven monumental masonry altars, each characterized by a unified composition and adorned with four massive piers. Through the efforts of the Trinitarian Order in the 18th century, six Late Baroque style altars, which harmonize with the sculptural wall decoration, were installed in the niches along the side walls, alongside an elegant pulpit featuring expressive Rococo forms.

The main High Altar was donated to the sanctuary by Józef Stanisław Sapieha, Coadjutor Bishop of Vilnius. This altar became the primary spiritual focal point of the complex, housing and enshrining for a long time the miraculous statue of Jesus the Nazarene (Ecce homo), which was sent by Pope Innocent XII in 1700. This sculpture – a copy based on an original located in Madrid – was the object of special devotion among pilgrims before it was later moved to the nearby Church of Saints Peter and Paul. Also prominent in the central part of the High Altar is an artistic, dramatically sculpted figure of the Crucified Redeemer, which underscores the sanctuary's dedication to the Redeemer. Below it, in a smaller niche, is a painting Jesus the Nazarene — the very spot where the famous miraculous sculpture historically stood. At the very top of the altar, between the capitals of the columns, the coat of arms of the Sapieha family (a fox with an arrow) can be seen, testifying to the significant patronage provided to this complex by the Sapieha family. Above the High Altar and on the walls the surviving stucco decorations from the school of Giovanni Pietro Perti are clearly visible. These are exceptionally high-quality Baroque reliefs: figures of angels and clouds motifs that appear to climb the walls toward the cupola. The elaborate entablature (the horizontal band above the columns) is adorned with floral ornaments. Moreover, two white sculptures of John of Matha (left) and Felix of Valois (right) stand on pedestals in the sides near the High Altar.

The artistic value of the sanctuary was historically enhanced by three paintings by the renowned artist Franciszek Smuglewicz, depicting the Most Holy Trinity – an object of particular veneration for the Trinitarians. Two other valuable works by Smuglewicz historically adorned the Trinitarian Monastery's refectory (dining hall): one depicted Saint Cajetan distributing miraculous bread, while the other portrayed the death of Saint John of Nepomuk, who was cast from a bridge into the Vltava River. On the left wall of the church stands the restored funerary monument of Aleksander Paweł Sapieha, Grand Marshal of Lithuania. This late Baroque piece features a marble slab and a portrait painted on canvas. It was commissioned by his son, Bishop Józef Stanisław Sapieha, in memory of his father.

The central part of the church is dominated by a light-wood organ case, situated above an arcaded vestibule. The organ loft, featuring Baroque forms and a undulating parapet, integrates harmoniously into the church's centralized space.

== See also ==
- List of churches in Vilnius
- Catholic Church in Lithuania
