= Vilnius Goldsmiths' Workshop =

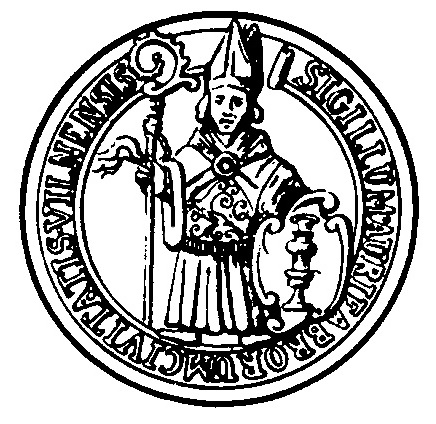
- Stamp of the Vilnius Goldsmiths' Workshop

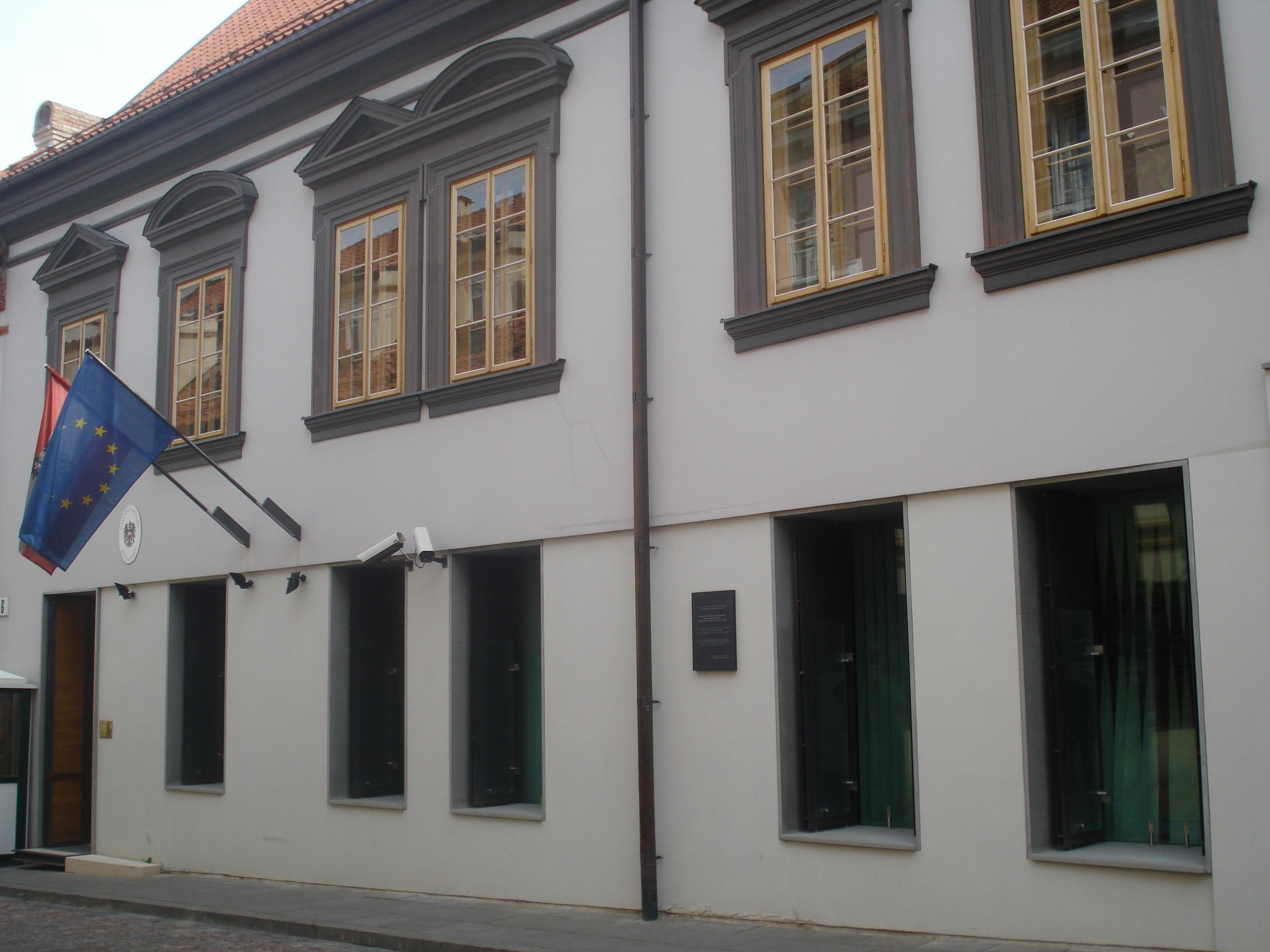
- Building which previously belonged to the Vilnius Goldsmiths' Workshop in Gaono Street 6, Vilnius, now is the Austrian Embassy
- Company type: Goldsmithing workshop
- Industry: Goldsmithing
- Founded: 1495; 531 years ago
- Defunct: 1893
- Headquarters: Vilnius, Grand Duchy of Lithuania
- Area served: Grand Duchy of Lithuania, later Russian Empire
- Products: Precious metals items with precious stones

The Vilnius Goldsmiths' Workshop (Lithuanian: Vilniaus auksakalių cechas) was a workshop of goldsmiths in Vilnius, then capital of the Grand Duchy of Lithuania, which was established on 23 August, 1495 when Grand Duke Alexander Jagiellon approved its statute. Together with the Vilnius Tailors' Workshop they were the first workshops in the Grand Duchy of Lithuania.

== History ==
The Vilnius Goldsmiths' Workshop was founded by a group of experienced goldsmiths who came from the most important centers of goldsmithing in Poland and Germany. They served the Roman Catholic Archdiocese of Vilnius, the territory up to the Daugava and the Dnieper Rivers. The goldsmiths worked for the Catholic Church, the manor of the Grand Duke of Lithuania, the Lithuanian nobility, the townspeople (e. g. masterpieces of the sacristy of the Vilnius Cathedral of the late Middle Ages and the early Renaissance).

Well known European goldsmiths worked in Vilnius. The goldsmiths of the manor of the ruler of the Grand Duchy of Lithuania purchased real estate in the capital, received privileges, and started families. During the reign of Grand Duke Stephen Báthory and the House of Vasa dynasty, the goldsmiths were retained from the treasury of the Grand Duchy of Lithuania. The number of craftsmen was not limited, they could come from different European cities.

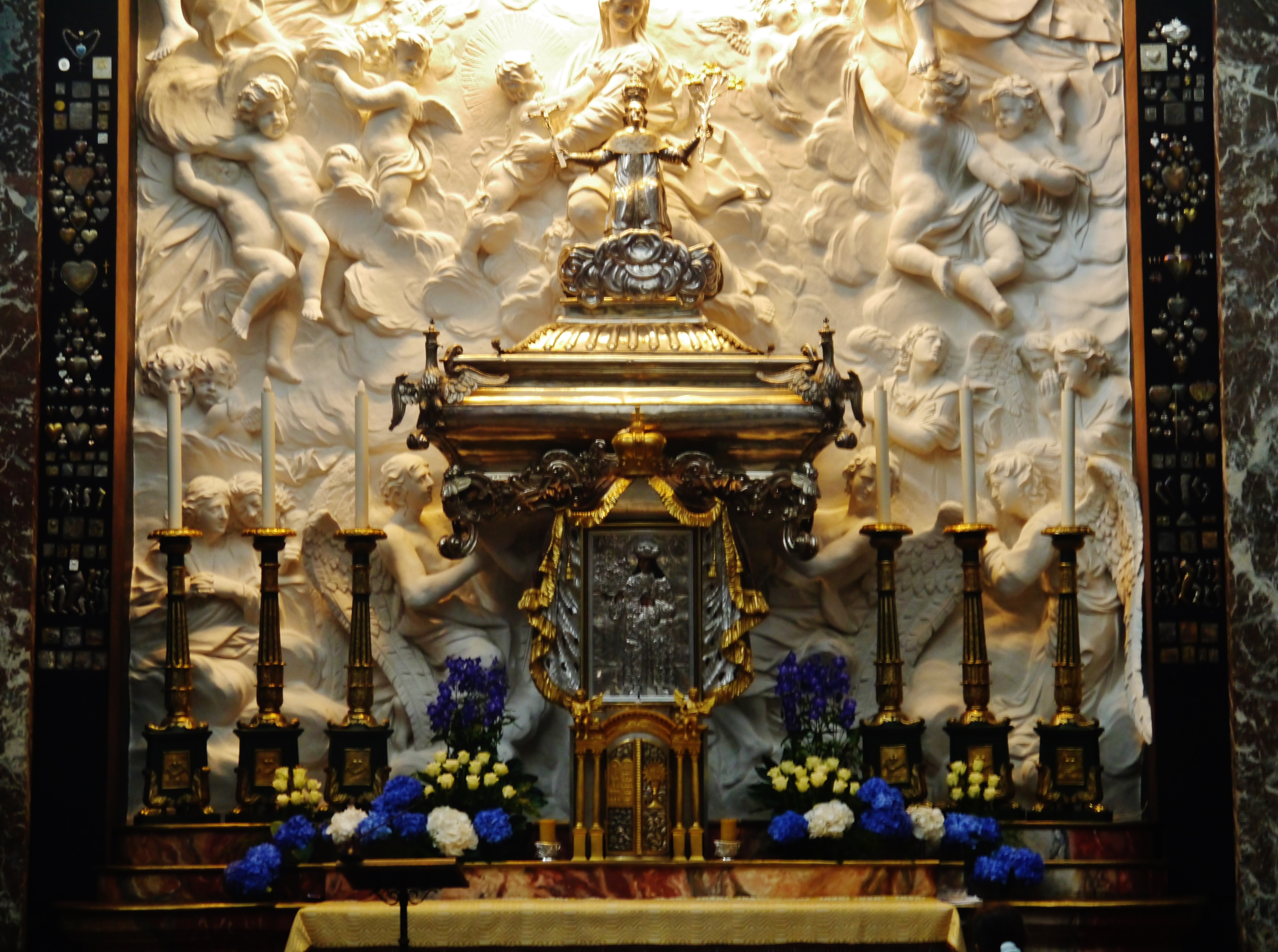
The reliquary and sarcophagus of Saint Casimir (1747) in the Chapel of Saint Casimir of Vilnius Cathedral

The most important feature of the Vilnius Goldsmiths' Workshop, which distinguishes it from the Polish and German workshops, was its heterogeneity from the national and confessional point of view (the interests of Catholics and Orthodox differed). In the 16th – 17th centuries it had up to 10 craftsmen, in the second half of the 17th century it had the most members – 24, in 1882 – only 5 members. In the second half of the 17th century, descendants of Vilnian families (and Lithuanians) dominated, also the indigenous peoples of the Grand Duchy of Lithuania participated. Most of the students and apprentices came from the cities of the Grand Duchy of Lithuania. There were about equal numbers of Catholic and Protestant goldsmiths, and two elders were elected from these two denominations.

During the prosperity period of the Vilnius Goldsmiths' Workshop in the 16th – 17th centuries, the goldsmiths controlled the trade of precious metals, precious stones and stood out for their wealth. The influential craftsmen were elected to the Magistrate of the City of Vilnius, as well as to the Seimas of the Grand Duchy of Lithuania. The workshop had a brick house (now Gaono Street 6, Vilnius).

Products of the Vilnius Goldsmiths' Workshop survived mostly in the Catholic churches of Lithuania. The 18th century products of Johann Friedrich Schömnick and J. Laris stands out for its artistry and are located in the Church of the Visitation of the Blessed Virgin Mary in Trakai, Lithuania. Another masterpiece of the Vilnius Goldsmiths' Workshop craftsmen is the reliquary and sarcophagus of Saint Casimir in the Chapel of Saint Casimir of Vilnius Cathedral, which was manufactured by J. K. Gronemann in 1747.

In the 19th century, the number of secular orders increased, however the products of the Vilnius Goldsmiths' Workshop were pushed out of the market due to the competition of Jewish goldsmiths and the spread of cheaper factory products.
