= General Potocki =

General Potocki may refer to:

- Antoni Potocki (1780–1850), Polish Army brigadier general
- Antoni Michał Potocki (died 1766), Crown Army of Poland lieutenant general
- Stanisław Kostka Potocki (1755–1821), Polish–Lithuanian Commonwealth general
- Stanisław Szczęsny Potocki (1751–1805), Polish–Lithuanian Commonwealth general
