= Antoni Potocki =

Antoni Potocki may refer to:

- Antoni Potocki (1780–1850), Polish nobleman
- Antoni Protazy Potocki (1761–1801), Polish noble
- Antoni Michał Potocki (died 1766), Polish noble
