= Pietro Perti =

Italian artist and architect

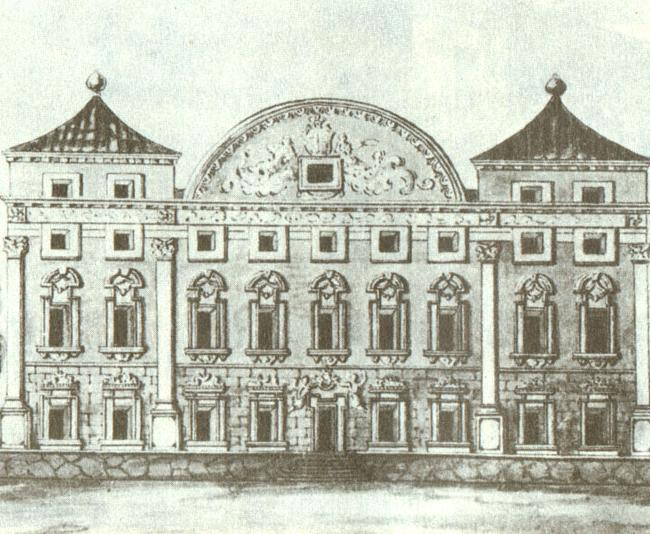
Sapieha Palace as designed by Perti

Giovanni Pietro Perti or Peretti (1648–1714) was an Italian Baroque sculptor and architect, regarded as one of the leading European sculptors on the verge of the 18th century. He was an elder of Šnipiškės and Antakalnis suburbs governed by Sapiehas in Vilnius, capital of the Grand Duchy of Lithuania.

== Biography ==
Living in Canton Ticino, Perti, as a sculptor of comasco school, was influenced by the Italian master Gian Lorenzo Bernini. Educated in Florence and invited to Vilnius by Michał Kazimierz Pac, Perti spent most of his life in the capital of the Grand Duchy of Lithuania working for magnate families. He became famous for the stucco decorations of the St. Peter and St. Paul's Church (1677–1682), considered a masterpiece of the Lithuanian Baroque. He worked together with Giovanni Maria Galli, who added the ornamentation around sculptures by Perti. Perti served in the manor of the Grand Hetman of Lithuania Jan Kazimierz Sapieha the Younger from 1689 until 1701

During his career Perti has designed, constructed, and decorated some of most prominent Lithuanian Baroque monuments in Vilnius: Slushko Palace (1690), Sapieha Palace (1691), and the Church of the Saviour with the Trinitarian monastery (started in 1691, decorated 1700–1705), all situated in Antakalnis; he reconstructed the interior and designed the stucco of the altar of the Chapel of St. Casimir in Vilnius Cathedral (1686–1688). Perti also participated in the decoration of the Pažaislis Monastery ensemble in Kaunas, together with Joan Merli and Michelangelo Palloni, whose daughter Maria Magdalena he was married to.

== Sources ==
1. Drėma, V. (1991). Dingęs Vilnius (in Lithuanian). Vilnius: Vaga. ISBN 5-415-00366-5.
