= Michelangelo Palloni =

Italian painter (1637–1712)

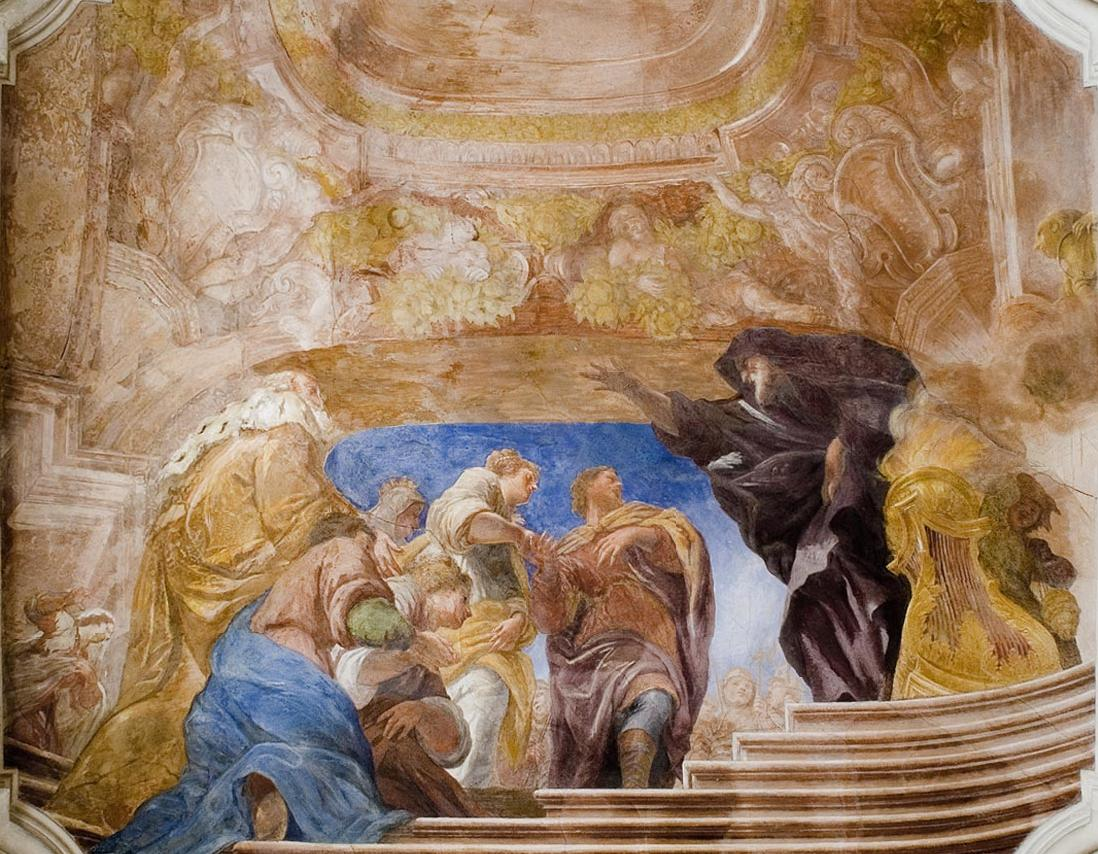
Michelangelo Palloni, fresco The Wedding of Psyche's Sisters, c. 1688, Wilanów Palace.

Michelangelo Palloni (1637—1712) was an Italian painter of the Baroque period, who worked in the Polish–Lithuanian Commonwealth from 1674 onward. Palloni was born at Campi Bisenzio, Florence.

== Biography ==
Palloni studied art in Florence and was a pupil of Baldassare Franceschini (Il Volterrano). Here he began his career, creating several frescoes, altarpieces, portraits and tapestries. In 1676, he came to Lithuania at the invitation of the Grand Hetman of the Grand Duchy of Lithuania, Michał Kazimierz Pac.

From 1676 to 1685 Palloni worked in Pažaislis, where he decorated the Pažaislis Monastery Camaldolese Church. He painted more than 100 frescoes in the church and created easel paintings.

From 1685 Palloni worked in the Krasiński Palace in Warsaw, and in 1688 he was appointed court painter to the King John III Sobieski. In the same year, Palloni decorated the Wilanów Palace and the Camaldolese Church in Bielany. Later he worked for Polish and Lithuanian noble families in Warsaw, Vilnius, Leszno and Węgrów.

In 1692 Palloni painted frescoes in the Chapel of Saint Casimir in Vilnius Cathedral. He also painted frescoes in the chapel of the missionary seminary in Łowicz around 1695 and in the parish church in Węgrów in 1710, which is likely to be his final work.

Many of Palloni's works have not survived, including the frescoes, painted around 1692, in the Sapieha Palace commissioned by the Grand Hetman of Lithuanian Kazimierz Jan Sapieha, in Vilnius.

The works are characteristic of the Baroque style: complex poses of figures, various angles, expressive, emotional gestures, and virtuoso rendering of draperies; he used illusionistic painting techniques and architectural backgrounds. Palloni's work had a great influence on Lithuanian painting of the late 17th-18th centuries.

== Major works ==
Frescoes and paintings in:

- Pažaislis Monastery in Kaunas, Lithuania
- Krasiński Palace, Warsaw, Poland
- The Open and Closed Galleries of Wilanów Palace (1688), Warsaw, Poland
- Chapel of St. Casimir in Vilnius Cathedral (1692), Lithuania
- Sapieha Palace in Vilnius, Lithuania
- Churches in Łowicz (1695) and in Węgrów (1706–08), Poland
