= Sapieha Palace, Vilnius =

Sapieha Palace
- Sapiegų rūmai (Lithuanian)
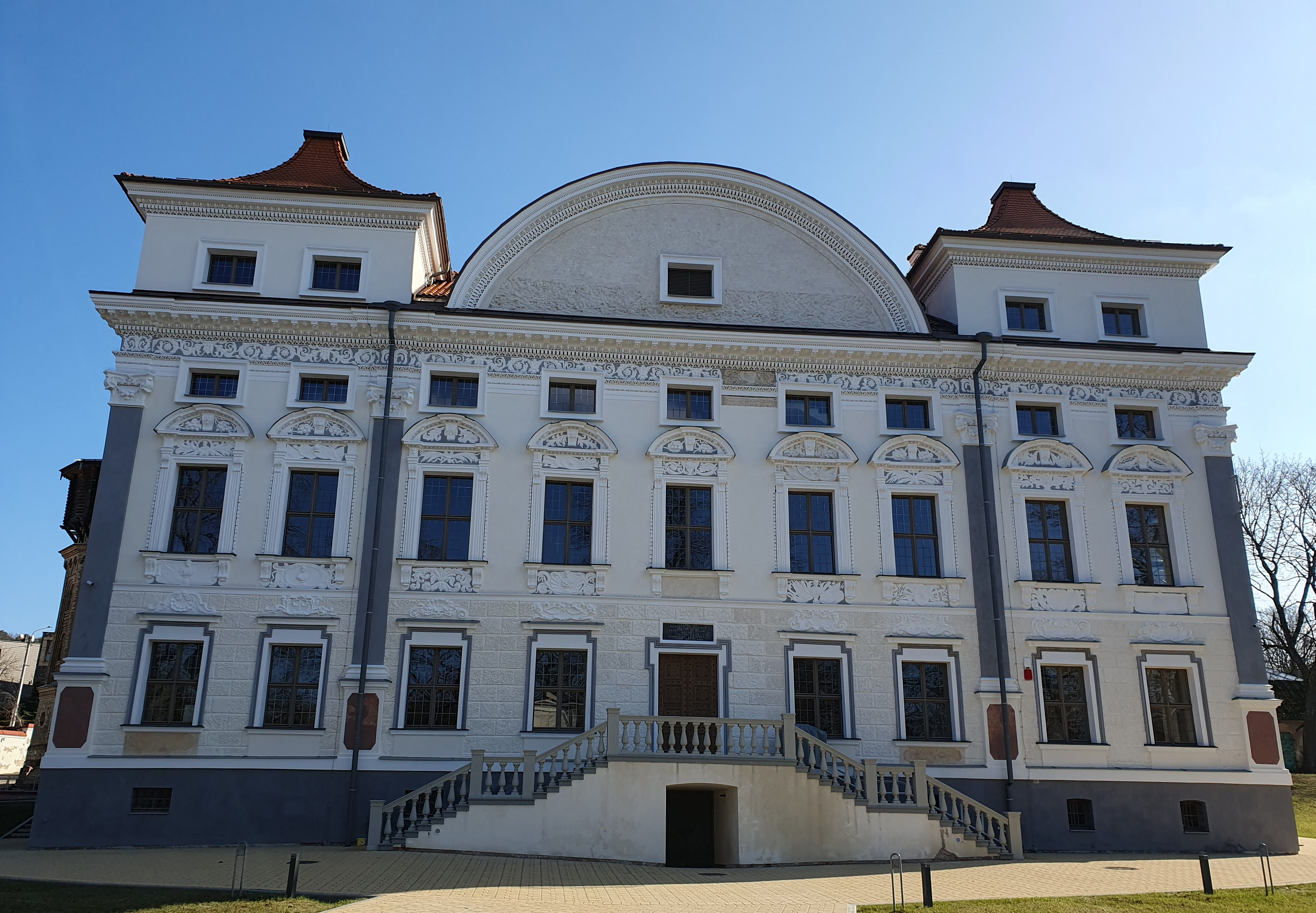
- Main façade of the Sapieha Palace after restoration in 2024

General information
- Architectural style: Baroque
- Location: Vilnius, Lithuania
- Coordinates: 54°41′55″N 25°18′50″E
- Year built: 1689–1692

Design and construction
- Architect: Giovanni Battista Frediani

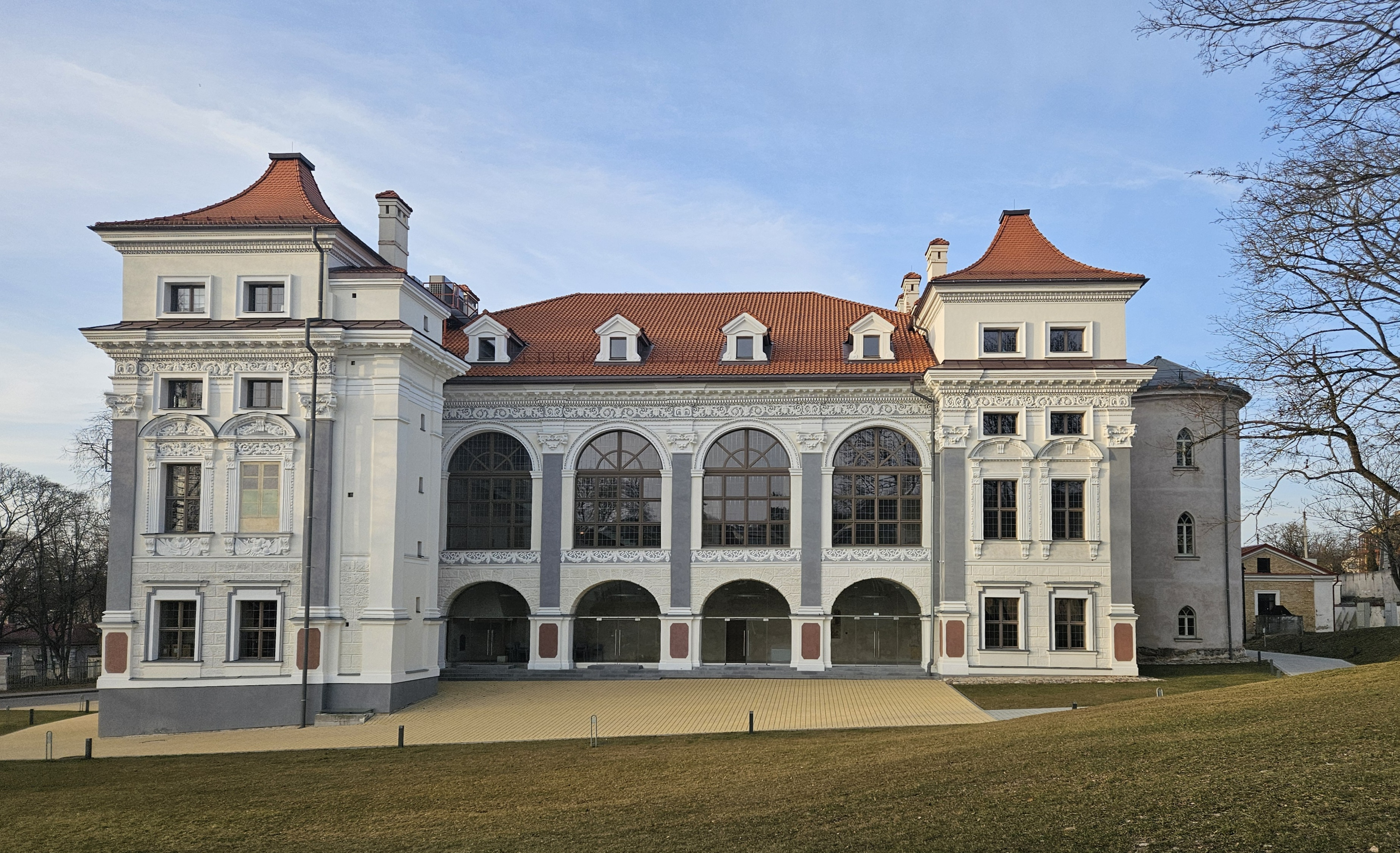
Side façade of the Sapieha Palace after restoration in 2024

Sapieha Palace (Lithuanian: Sapiegų rūmai, Polish: Pałac Sapiehów) is a High Baroque palace in Sapiegos str., Antakalnis district of Vilnius, Lithuania. It is the only surviving palace of several formerly belonging to the Sapieha family in the city. The palace is surrounded by the remains of the 17th-century formal park, with parterres, ponds, and avenues. The impressive Baroque gate secures the entrance to the park from Antakalnis street and the other gate is on the opposite side of the park, near the palace. Both of them were restored in 2012.

== History ==
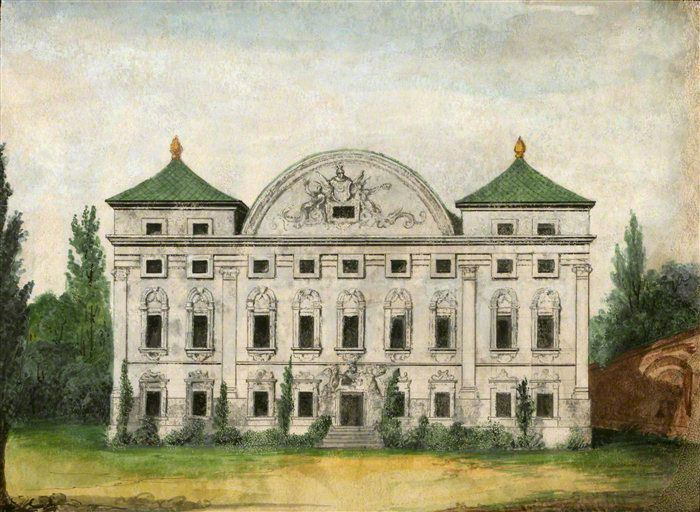
Main façade of the Palace in 1819

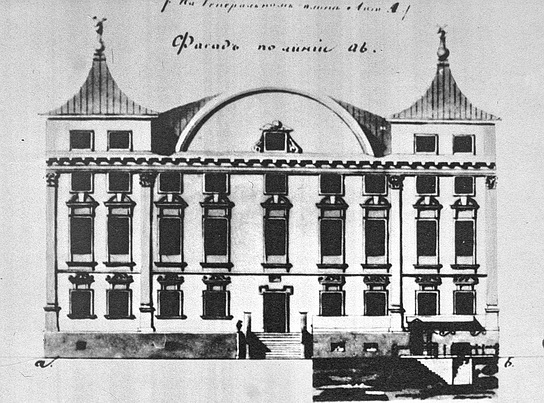
Drawing of the palace's main façade before reconstruction in 1830

On the site where the Sapieha Palace was eventually built at the end of the 16th century, either Stefan Bielawski or Teodor Lacki constructed a brick palace. In 1619, it became the property of Piotr Nonhard, the Starost of Varėna and Horodniczy of Vilnius. The palace changed hands several times; among its owners was Hetman Michał Kazimierz Pac. Finally, in 1682, Kazimierz Jan Sapieha purchased it from the Jesuits.

The Hetman planned to transform the palace into the center of an extensive residential complex, which, in addition to the palace itself, included a garden, a hunting area, two courtyards (a ceremonial one and a service one), as well as a church-mausoleum dedicated to the Lord Jesus, along with a Trinitarian monastery. The entire complex was completed around 1717. Around the estate, the Sapieha jurydyka began to grow, eventually extending as far as Rokantiškės.

The architect of both the palace and the church was Giovanni Battista Frediani. The stucco decoration was executed by Pietro Perti, while the painting work was done by Michelangelo Palloni. The garden was designed by a Frenchman whose first name remains unknown, possibly Lamot who was active at the court of King John III Sobieski.

The previous structure was not demolished but expanded to a larger size, with some elements removed. As a result, the palace is positioned diagonally relative to the garden, which was designed on the western side, parallel to the Dyneburg route. The entrance to the palace courtyard is located on the southern side, through the Vilnius Gate. The building’s design, featuring distinctive pseudo-defensive corner tower pavilions and arcaded loggias on the side facades, drew inspiration from Italian Renaissance architecture, particularly the Poggio Reale villa, popular in the contemporary Polish-Lithuanian Commonwealth. The direct inspiration appears to be the Villa Regia in Warsaw, built by King Władysław IV. External stairs led to a vaulted vestibule, from which one entered the representative section on the upper floor, while residential quarters were located in the corners.

Originally, the palace had multi-floor arcades on its sides, which were later built up to gain more space inside the building. Jan Kazimierz Sapieha the Younger by building the luxurious Sapieha Palace ensemble wished to surpass the John III Sobieski projects and to show his power and ability to be a Grand Duke of Lithuania and King of Poland.

=== 19th century ===
In 1809 the palace was acquired by the Russian government and restructured (according to Józef Poussier's design) into a military hospital in 1843. Much of the rich interior was destroyed throughout the 19th century.

=== 20th century ===
The exterior of the palace was restored only in 1927-1928 and the building housed University's ophthalmology institute until World War II. Since the war, it has been used as a military hospital again and fell into disrepair.

=== 21st century ===
In the early years of the century the complex housed the Sapieha Hospital (Lithuanian: Sapiegos ligoninė).

Since 2012, the palace has been undergoing restoration, in an attempt to bring it as close as possible to its original Baroque appearance.

== See also ==
- Sapieha Palace, Warsaw
- Slushko Palace

== Bibliography ==
- Czyż, Anna Sylwia (2021). Pałace Wilna XVII–XVIII wieku [Palaces of Vilnius 17th-18th centuries] (in Polish). Warsaw: Narodowy Instytut Polskiego Dziedzictwa Kulturowego za Granicą POLONIKA.
