= Slushko Palace =

Baroque palace in Vilnius, Lithuania

Coordinates: 54°41′28″N 025°17′50″E

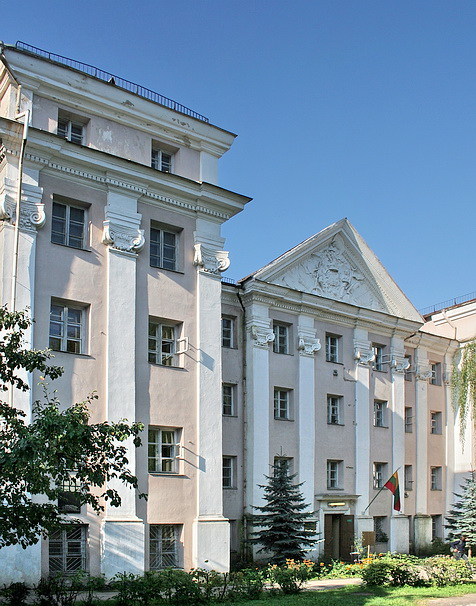
Best preserved eastern façade of the palace

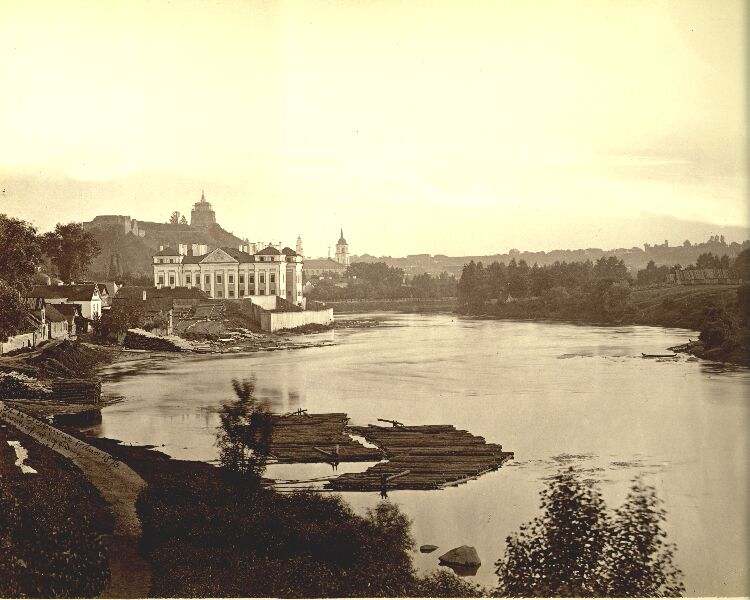
View of Slusko Palace in 1873

Slushko Palace (Lithuanian: Sluškų rūmai, Polish: Pałac Słuszków) in Vilnius, Lithuania is a Baroque palace situated on the left bank of Neris River in the Old Town elderate, former Antakalnis suburb of the city.

The palace was erected in 1690–1700 by voivode of Polock Dominik Słuszko, who ordered creating an artificial peninsula on Neris for the purpose of building the palace there. The peninsula was formed from the soil of the leveled down hill separating Antakalnis from the Vilnius Castles. Initially the façades of the palace were unified by a giant order of Ionic pilasters framing huge windows. It is believed that the decoration works of the palace were performed by Michelangelo Palloni and Giovanni Pietro Perti who was the architect of the palace.

The Polish–Lithuanian rulers used to stay in the palace during their visits in the city after the Royal Palace was damaged. The tsar Peter I of Russia stayed and had his headquarters established here in 1705 and 1709.

After Słuszko's death the palace was owned by the Puzyna princely family (of Rurikid stock) since 1727 and by the Potocki family since 1745. The Piarist monks bought the palace in 1756 and established a collegiate and a printing house. Later it was bought by Michał Kazimierz Ogiński in 1766 and reconstructed by Pietro de Rossi. The palace was confiscated by the tsarist government in 1794 and transformed into an apartment house. It housed a brewery of Dominik Zajkowski from 1803 until 1831 when the palace was taken by tsarist military. The building was rearranged, the floors were redivided into four, and the palace served as a military prison since 1872. The rich original interior and exterior of the palace have not survived.

Nowadays the palace houses the Lithuanian Academy of Music and Theatre. In the meantime the outhouses are undergoing the restoration and the main palace is planned to come next. The palace is planned to regain its original two main floors layout and original Baroque style windows.
