= Chapel of St. Casimir =

Chapel in Vilnius Cathedral, Lithuania

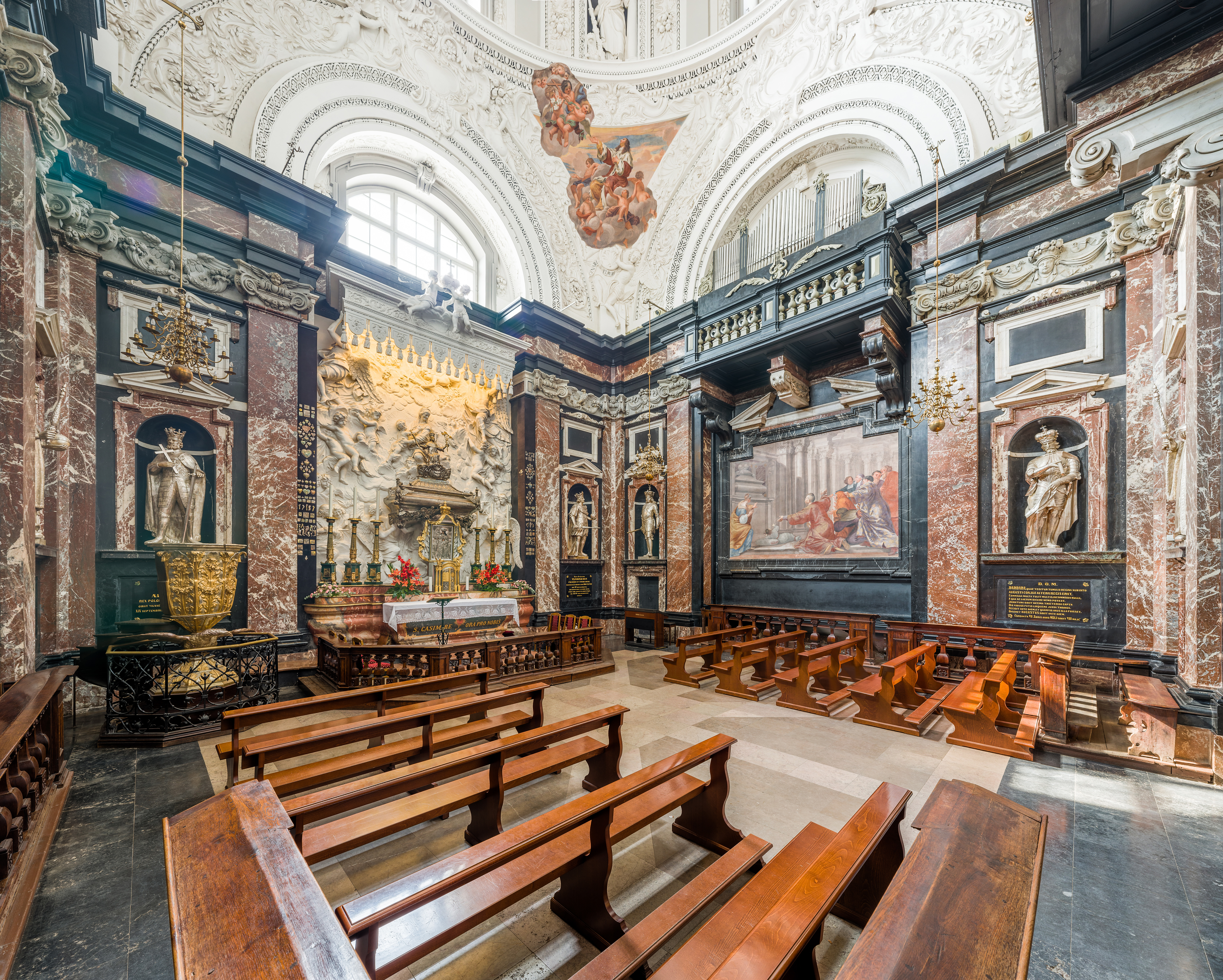
- Interior of the Chapel of Saint Casimir
- Chapel of St. Casimir
- 54°41′08.6″N 25°17′17.7″E
- Address: Vilnius Cathedral, Vilnius
- Country: Lithuania
- Denomination: Roman Catholic

History
- Status: Chapel
- Dedication: Saint Casimir
- Consecrated: 14 August 1634

Architecture
- Architect: Costante Tencalla
- Architectural type: Church architecture
- Style: Baroque
- Groundbreaking: 1624
- Completed: 1631

The Chapel of St. Casimir is a Roman Catholic chapel, that is dedicated to Saint Casimir, located in the Vilnius Cathedral, in Vilnius, Lithuania. The chapel was built in 1623–36 after Prince Casimir (1458–1484) was canonized as saint. It was built and decorated in the Baroque style by Italian sculptors and architects commissioned by Sigismund III Vasa, King of Poland and Grand Duke of Lithuania. The centerpiece of the chapel is a faux marble altar which holds the silver sarcophagus with Casimir's remains and the icon Three-Handed Saint Casimir.

== History ==
=== Construction ===
Prince Casimir was the second oldest son of the King of Poland and Grand Duke of Lithuania Casimir IV and Queen Elisabeth of Austria. After his elder brother Vladislaus was elected as King of Bohemia in 1471, Casimir became the heir apparent. However, he focused on devotion to God and became known for his piety. He became ill (most likely with tuberculosis) and died at the age of 25. Prince Casimir was buried in a crypt under a Chapel of Chapel of the Blessed Virgin Mary that his father reserved for the royal family. He was the first burial in this chapel. It is located to the left of the entrance and is now known as the Wołłowicz Chapel after Bishop Eustachy Wołłowicz. Other family members buried in the chapel were Casimir's brother Alexander Jagiellon and two wives of Casimir's nephew Sigismund II Augustus – Elizabeth of Austria and Barbara Radziwiłł.

Sigismund III Vasa, as a descendant of the Jagiellonians, had already begun efforts in 1600 to renovate the chapel; these intensified during the preparations for the prince’s canonization, which took place in 1604. In 1610, a fire broke out in Vilnius, in which the cathedral was damaged; it was subsequently restored in 1612–1619. The old small chapel did not suit the new function to house relics of a saint but no space could be found for a new chapel until Bishop Wołłowicz agreed to swap his chapel with the royal chapel in February 1624. The old Wołłowicz's chapel was demolished and construction started for the new Chapel of Saint Casimir.

King Sigismund III Vasa financed the construction and hired Italian architect Costante Tencalla for the chapel's plan. The construction was finished in 1631.

=== Decoration ===
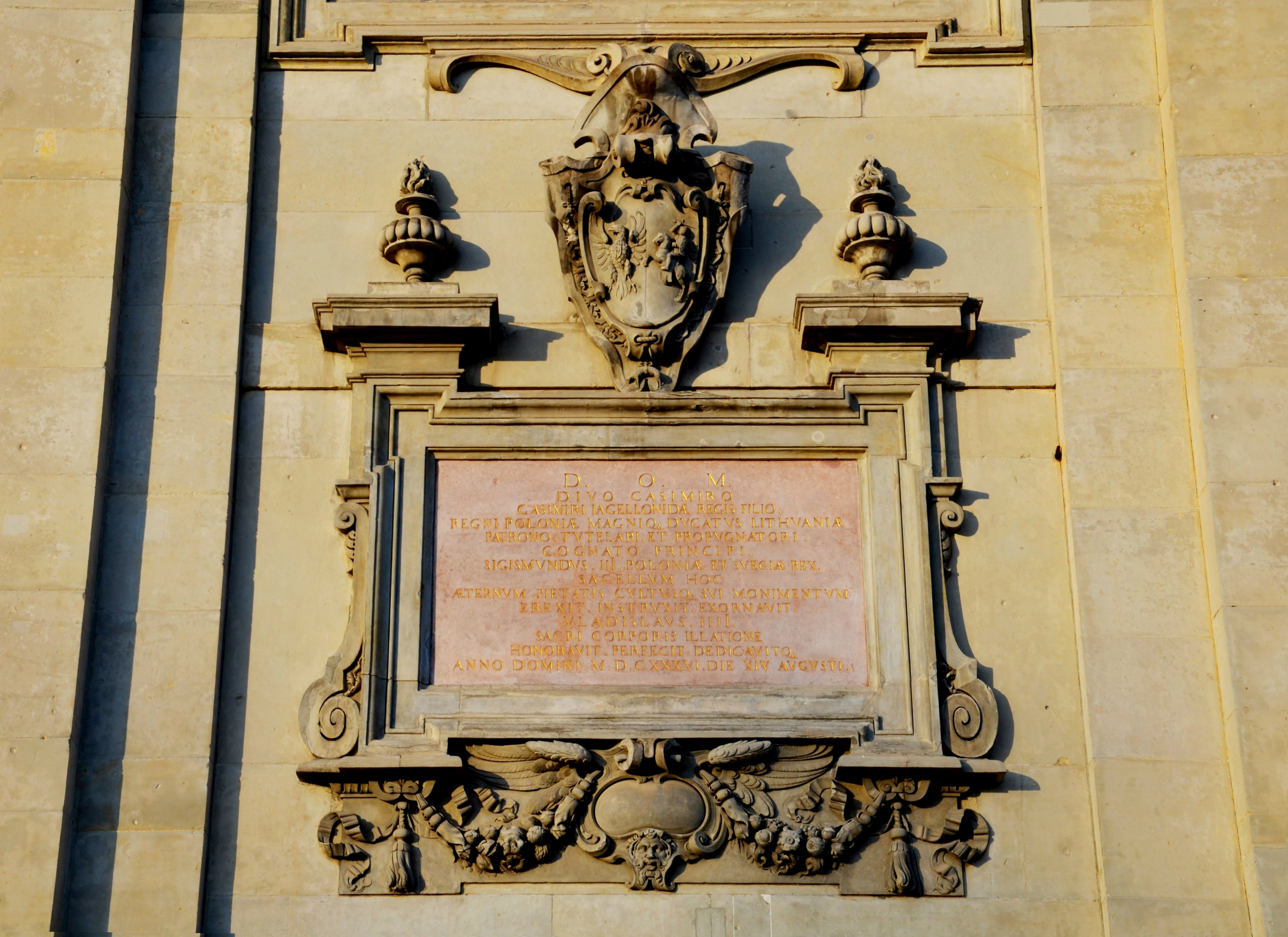
Foundation plaque on the wall of the chapel from Cathedral Square with the coat of arms of the Polish–Lithuanian Commonwealth and the latin inscription: lit. 'To God, the Best and Greatest. / To Saint Casimir, / son of Casimir, king of the Jagiellonian dynasty, / patron, guardian, and defender / of the Kingdom of Poland and the Grand Duchy of Lithuania, / a kinsman prince, / Sigismund III, King of Poland and Sweden, / this chapel / as an eternal monument of his piety and devotion / erected, furnished, and adorned. / Władysław IV, / by the translation of the sacred body, / honored, completed, and dedicated it / in the Year of the Lord 1636, on the 14th day of August'.

The interior finishing works continued for several more years, until 1636. The king had commissioned, before 1619, a reliquary coffin and a silver-and-ebony altar for the chapel, for which the figures were cast in 1627 by Augsburg goldsmiths, the brothers Hans Jacob Bair.

The plague then prevailing in Vilnius, and ultimately his death in 1632, did not allow King Sigismund III to see the chapel completed. It was only his son, Władysław IV, who in the first year of peace during his reign, in 1636, was able to take part in the translation of the relics of Saint Casimir to the new place of worship. King Władysław IV continued work on the chapel, contributing to the creation of a separate sacristy, the decoration of the dome, and various painting and ornamental works. Among those involved in the chapel’s painted decoration were Giacinto Campana and Bartłomiej Strobel. In the years 1646–1648, the architect Benedykt Molli carried out certain modifications to the chapel.

The painted and sculptural decoration of the chapel formed part of the dynastic propaganda of the House of Vasa in Poland–Lithuania. The walls were adorned with depictions of the military victories of the Jagiellons and the Vasas, as well as scenes from the lives of St. Casimir and St. Sigismund. Particular care was devoted to this by King Władysław IV Vasa, who gave his son the names Sigismund Casimir Vasa, seeing him as his natural successor. For this reason, following the example of the Habsburgs and the Wittelsbachs, he ordered his heart to be buried in St. Casimir’s Chapel.

=== Destruction and reconstruction ===
During the Deluge, in 1655 Vilnius was occupied by Russian forces, which remained there until 1661. The city suffered extensive destruction; the cathedral and the castle, along with the chapel, became targets of deliberate devastation as symbols, among other things, of victories over Russia. The reconstruction of the chapel began in 1680, but its principal decoration was carried out after 1692 by Pietro Perti and Michelangelo Palloni. The rebuilding was financed by Lithuanian magnates: the Bishop of Smolensk and provost of the chapel, Eustachy Kotowicz, the Bishop of Samogitia, Kazimierz Pac, and the Hetman Kazimierz Jan Sapieha. The involvement of the royal court remains uncertain. Most of the dynastic and military decorations were not restored; instead, the focus shifted to scenes depicting the life and achievements of the saint.

== Three-Handed St. Casimir ==
Three-Handed St. Casimir without silver vestment

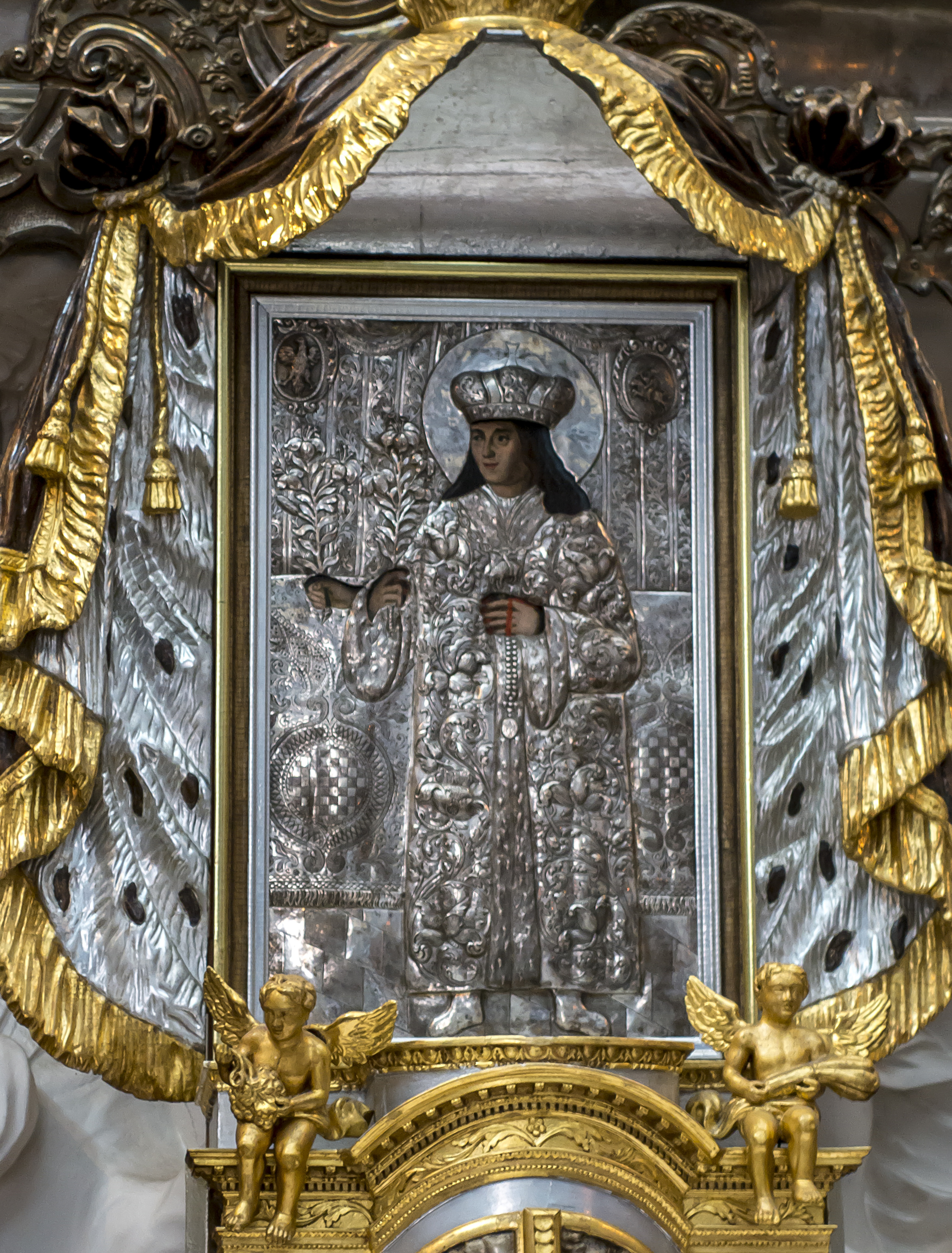
Three-Handed St. Casimir with silver vestment

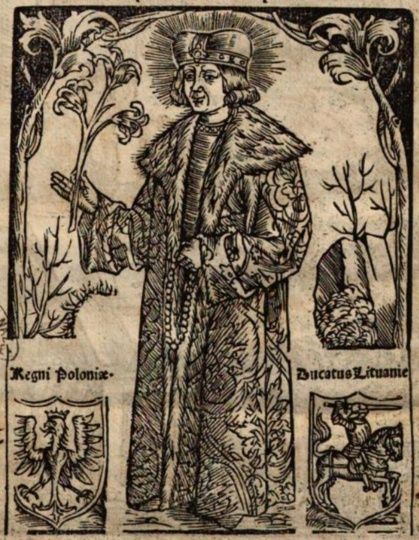
Woodcut of Saint Casimir (1521)

Three-Handed St. Casimir is an anonymous painting of Saint Casmir which hangs under his silver sarcophagus in the chapel. It features Casimir with three hands (he has two right hands that each hold a lily) and is considered miraculous. The legend has it that the painter wanted to alter the composition and painted the second right hand, but he could not cover the first right hand – it kept reappearing. The legend was first recorded by Bernhard Leopold Tanner in 1689. However, a study of the painting under UV light and X-ray during restoration works in 1982–1985 revealed that both hands were painted at the same time and there is no evidence of attempts to cover one of them. Three hands is an unusual motif in religious art. Povilas Rėklaitis cited an example of Trojeručica, an icon of the Eastern Orthodox Church, as a possible inspiration. The three hands are unique to this particular painting of Saint Casimir. While the figure of Saint Casimir was copied numerous times, the copies only have two hands.

It is painted on a thin 45 by 75 centimetres (18 in × 30 in) wooden plank. The overall composition is very similar to the woodcut published by papal legate Zacharias Ferreri in Casimir's first hagiography in 1521. The main differences are the third hand and that the woodcut is set outdoors, while the painting is set indoors. It is believed that the woodcut and the painting were completed around the same time based on a lost original. Possibly this lost original was a portrait completed while Casimir was still alive but lost during a fire in Vilnius Cathedral in 1530. The painting was touched up in 1594 as evidenced by an inscription in a Renaissance cartouche at the bottom which cites a line from Psalm 92: The righteous shall flourish like the palm tree: he shall grow like a cedar in Lebanon. Likely at this time, the original pendant which is worn by Casimir and which depicted Madonna with child was replaced by the Order of the Golden Fleece. Saint Casimir did not receive the order and it was likely added to appease King Sigismund III Vasa. The order is also present in the cartouche outside the chapel which records information about its completion in 1636.

== Murals ==
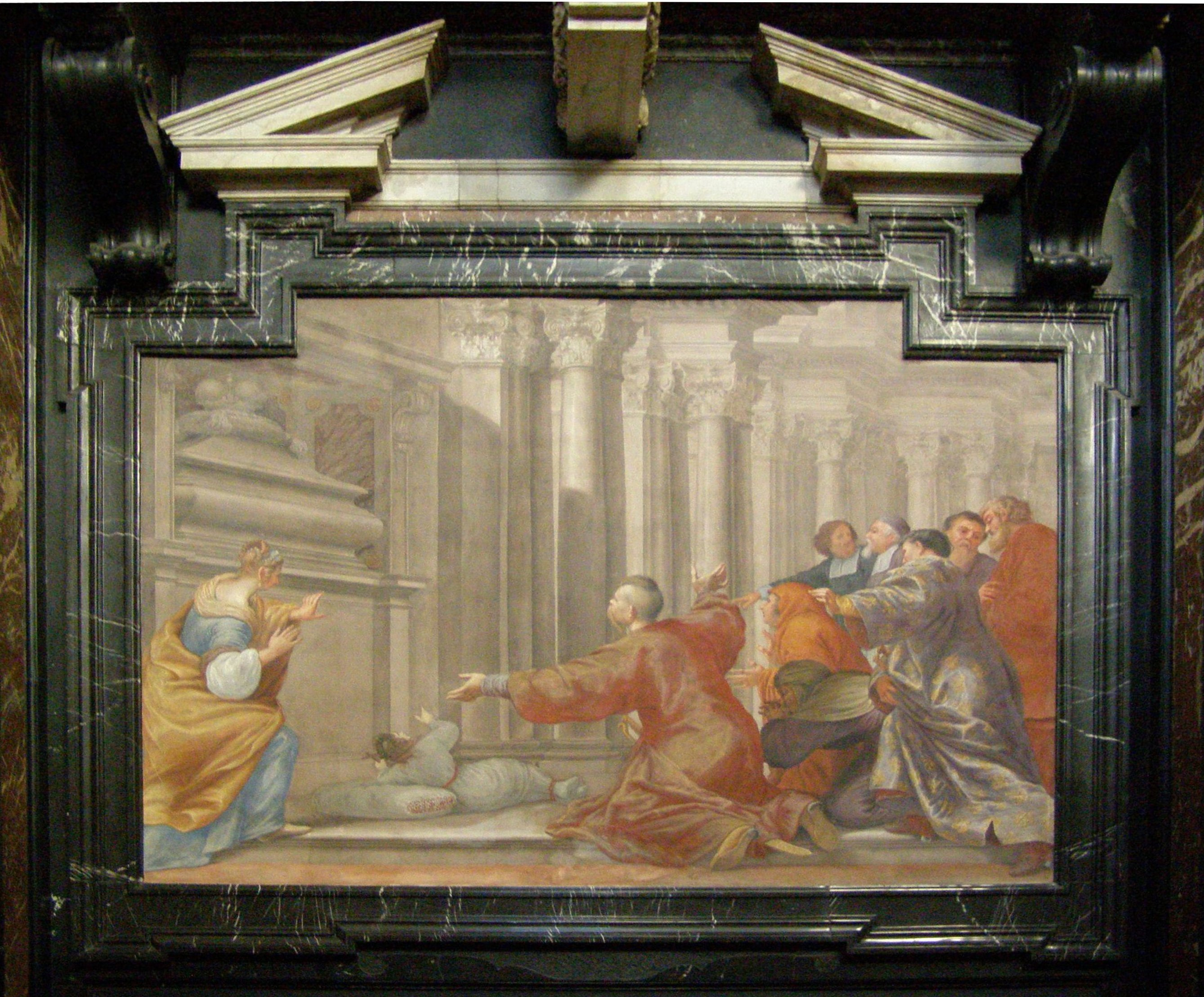
The Resurrection of Ursula

The chapel has two expressive murals by Florentine artist Michelangelo Palloni completed during the restoration work in 1692.

The Opening of the Coffin of St. Casimir measures 285 by 402 centimetres (112 in × 158 in) and decorates the east wall. It depicts the opening of St. Casimir's coffin on August 16, 1604 during his canonization proceedings. The body in the coffin was found intact, 120 years after the burial. The saint is wearing a long red robe, decorated with stoat fur, and a ducal crown. Bishop Benedykt Woyna, who wrote to Rome of a wonderful smell after the lid was lifted, has his hands raised to heaven in praise of the Lord. Kneeling at the head of the saint is Gregorius Swiecicki, the canon at Vilnius Cathedral chapter, who was entrusted with Casimir's canonization process. Jan Kazimierz Sapieha who commissioned the painting stands on the right; Virgin Mary and Saint Peter, dressed in clothes of the time, stand on the left. Around them are priests with long candles in their hands.

The Resurrection of Ursula measures 295 by 402 centimetres (116 in × 158 in) and decorates the west wall. It depicts the first known miracle of St. Casimir. After the death of a young girl Ursula, her father went to the coffin of the prince to pray for her and the girl miraculously resurrected. The artist skillfully depicts surprise and astonishment of the father, other relatives, and clergy.

== Sculptures of rulers ==
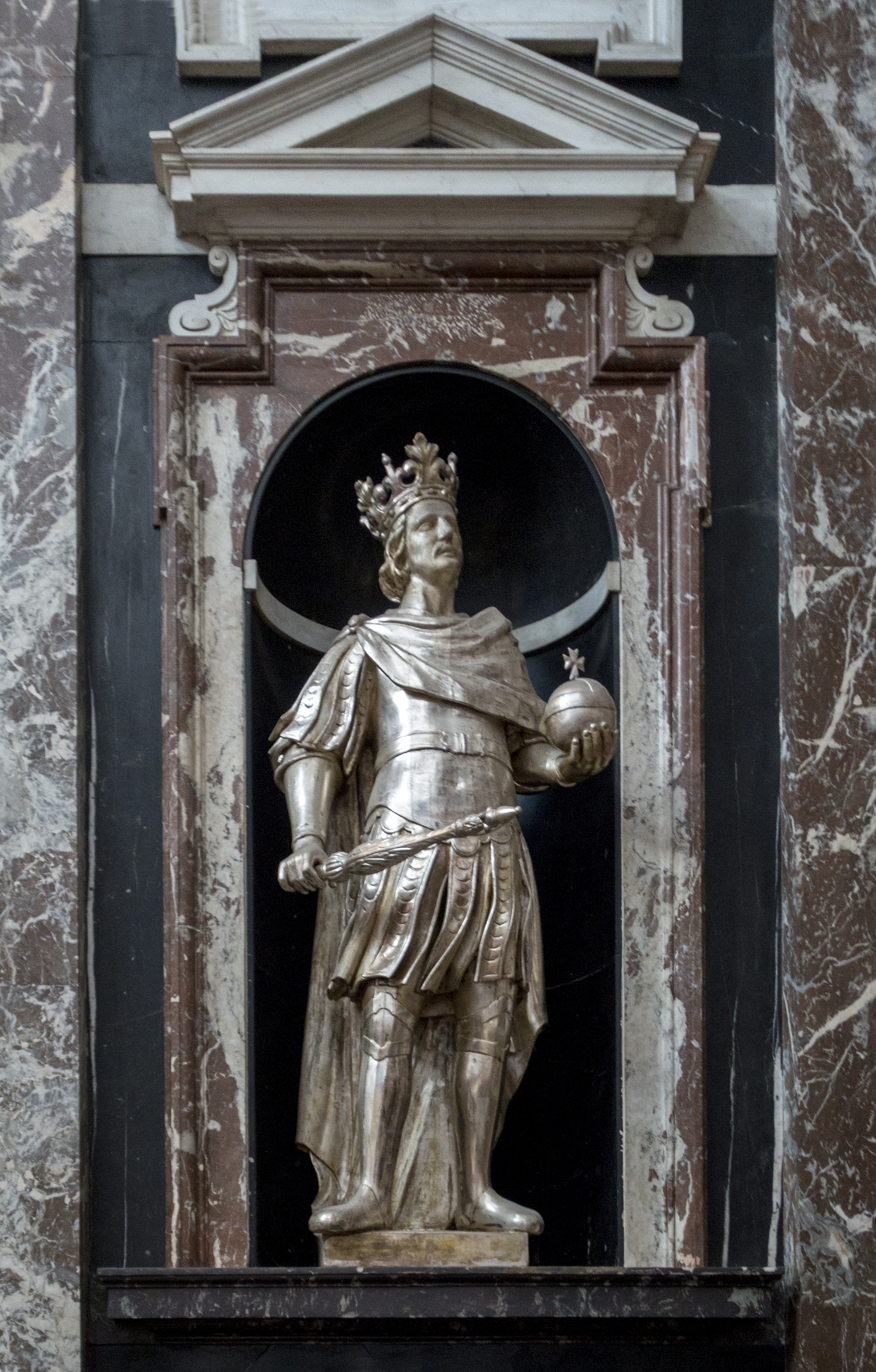
One of the eight sculptures of rulers traditionally identified as John I Albert

The chapel has eight sculptures of rulers that stand in marble niches in the four corners. At about 2.2 m (7 ft 3 in) in height, the sculptures are taller than life size. They are carved from wood and plated in silver. They were carved with particular attention to individualized details: attributes of power, clothes, facial details, hand gestures, and poses (they are turned a bit to the left or the right so they face the main altar better). The author, date of creation, and identity of the figures are unknown and are subject to speculation by art historians.

The chapel originally had eight pure silver sculptures that measured about 1 m (3 ft 3 in) in height and that were melted during the Deluge (1655–1660), but they stood in the main altar. The marble niches were probably created in 1620s or 1630s but there is no mention that they had any sculptures in them until 1737 when an inventory listed eight wooden sculptures of kings and emperors. According to Marija Matušakaitė, the sculptures are of late Baroque style and should be dated the second quarter of the 18th century. The first claims that the sculptures depict Polish kings were recorded in a 1828 report of canonical visitation and in a 1835 book on the history of Vilnius by Michał Baliński. This theory of the Jagiellonian kings gained popularity and in 1878 the names were written in gilded letters on the postaments: Władysław II Jagiełło (Jogaila) (reigned 1386–1434), Władysław of Varna (1434–1444), Casimir IV Jagiellon (1447–1492), Saint Casimir, John I Albert (1492–1501), Alexander Jagiellon (1501–1506), Sigismund I the Old (1507–1548), and Sigismund II Augustus (1548–1572). At some point, Lithuanian historiography replaced Władysław of Varna with Władysław IV Vasa (1632–1648). The writings since has disappeared, but these names are often cited.

Not all researchers agree with the traditional identification. Already in 1840 Józef Ignacy Kraszewski proposed that the sculptures depict royal saints but the sculptures have no symbols or attributes of sainthood. The sculptures are too detailed and personalized to depict abstract royals or saints. Matušakaitė suggested that one of the sculptures depicts Vytautas, Grand Duke of Lithuania (1392–1430), and not Władysław of Varna or Władysław Vasa. Mindaugas Paknys noted that two sculptures wear imperial crowns (other researchers considered them grand ducal caps as they are visually very similar) and suggested that they depict Camimir's grandfather Albert II of Germany, elected but not crowned King of the Romans, and Frederick III, Holy Roman Emperor, who raised orphaned Casimir's mother. According to Paknys, the other six sculptures depict Casimir's immediate family: grandfather Władysław Jagiełło, father Casimir, and brothers Vladislaus, John Albert, Alexander, and Sigismund.

== Gallery ==
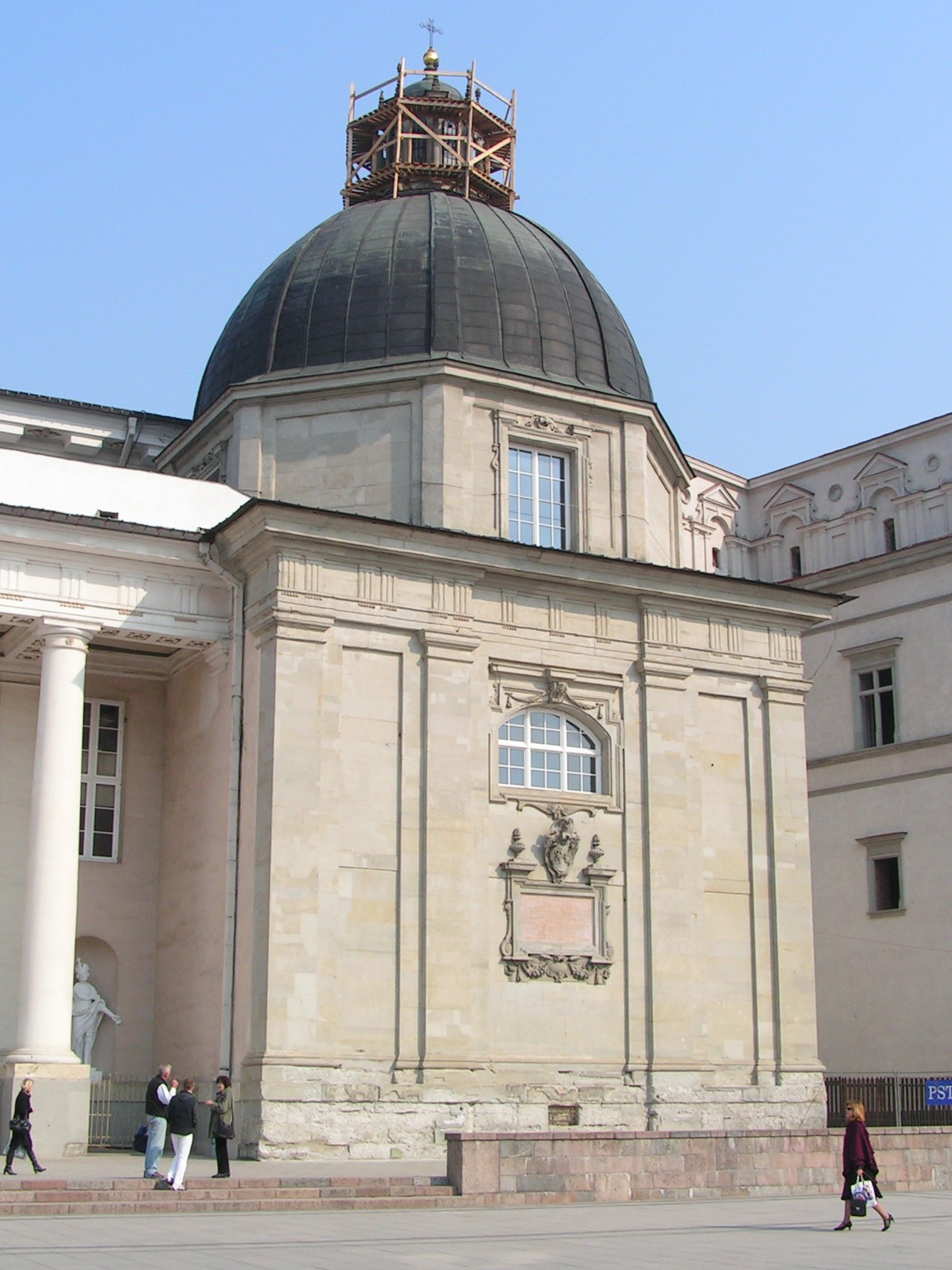
Chapel from the outside

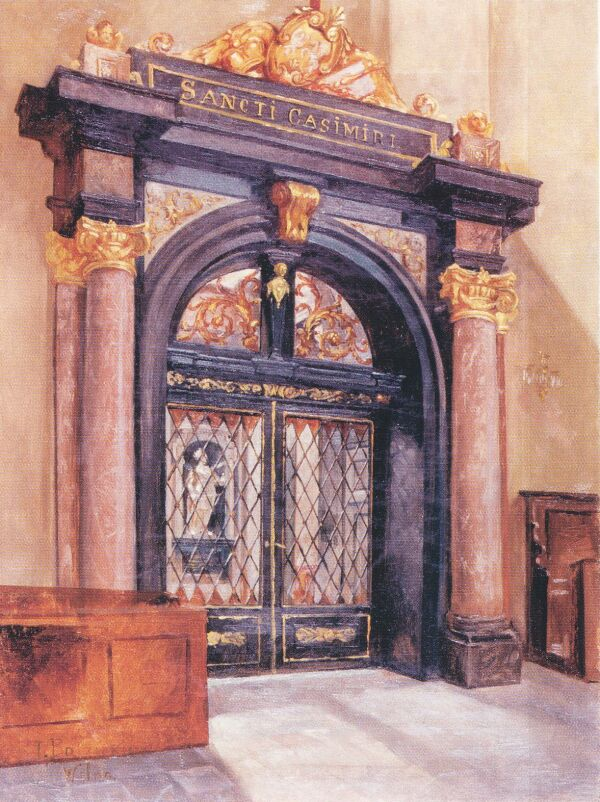
Gates to the chapel from inside the cathedral in 1912 by Józef Bałzukiewicz

Interior of the dome, decorated with frescoes and sculptures

People praying in front of the sarcophagus of St. Casimir in 1901

== Bibliography ==
- Blažiūnas, Juozapas (2012). "Vilniaus miesto bažnyčių ir vienuolynų paveikslų tvarkyba nuo XVI a. antros pusės iki XVIII a. pabaigos" (PDF). Acta Academiae Artium Vilnensis (in Lithuanian). 64. ISSN 1392-0316.
- Bielinis, Jonas; et al., eds. (1988). Lietuvos TSR istorijos ir kultūros paminklų sąvadas (in Lithuanian). Vol. 1. Vilnius: Vyriausioji enciklopedijų redakcija. OCLC 21449203.
- Czyż, Anna Sylwia (2021). "O inwestycjach budowlanych Wazów w Wilnie" [On the construction investments of the House of Vasa in Vilnius] (PDF). Rocznik Lituanistyczny (in Polish). 7.
- Jamski, Piotr J. (2006). "Kaplica św. Kazimierza w Wilnie i jej twórcy" [Chapel of St. Casimir in Vilnius and its creators]. Biuletyn Historii Sztuki (in Polish). 68 (1).
- Maslauskaitė, Sigita (2004). "Šv. Kazimiero atvaizdas: pirmavaizdis ir kartotės" (PDF). Acta Academiae Artium Vilnensis (in Lithuanian). 35. ISSN 1392-0316.
- Paknys, Mindaugas (2012). "Šv. Kazimiero koplyčios karalių skulptūros. Ką apie jas žinome?". Lietuvos kultūros karališkasis dėmuo: įvaizdžiai, simboliai, reliktai. Acta Academiae Artium Vilnensis (in Lithuanian). Vol. 65–66. Vilniaus dailės akademijos leidykla. ISBN 978-609-447-068-4.
- Rėklaitis, Povilas (March 1958a). "Šv. Kazimiero koplyčia Vilniuje (I)". Aidai (in Lithuanian). 3 (108). ISSN 0002-208X.
- Rėklaitis, Povilas (April 1958b). "Šv. Kazimiero koplyčia Vilniuje (II)". Aidai (in Lithuanian). 4 (109). ISSN 0002-208X.
- Rėklaitis, Povilas (May–June 1984). "Prie šv. Kazimiero ikonografijos". Aidai (in Lithuanian). 3 (346). ISSN 0002-208X.
- Širmulis, Alfredas (2006). "Vilniaus arkikatedros Šv. Kazimiero koplyčios valdovų statulų identifikavimas". Šventųjų relikvijos Lietuvos kultūroje. Acta Academiae Artium Vilnensis (in Lithuanian). Vol. 41. Vilniaus dailės akademijos leidykla. ISBN 995-562-461-2.
