= Gaono Street =

Street in Vilnius, Lithuania

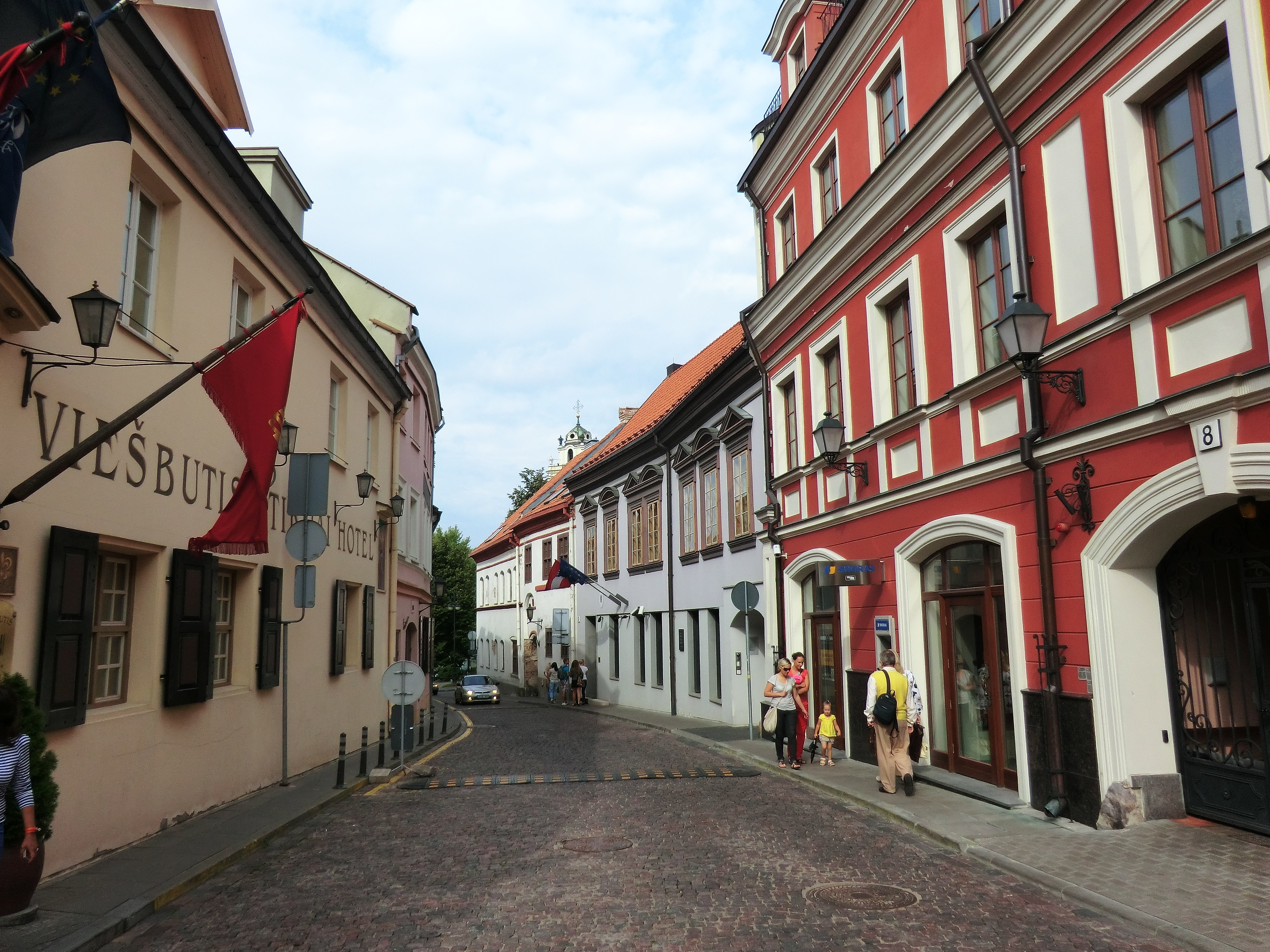
- Gaono Street in summer
- Native name: Gaono gatvė (Lithuanian)
- Former name(s): Dworcowa, Filipowska, I Szklanna, Szklanna, Szklanna II, Гаона, Школьная
- Length: 150 m (490 ft)
- Location: Vilnius, Lithuania
- Postal code: LT-01131
- Coordinates: 54°40′51″N 25°17′11.3″E

Gaono Street (Lithuanian: Gaono gatvė) is a street in the Old Town of Vilnius, the capital of Lithuania. The street was part of the Jewish quarter of Vilnius, and it is named after the Vilna Gaon, who previously lived there.
