= Jerzy Hoppen =

Polish artist (1891-1969)

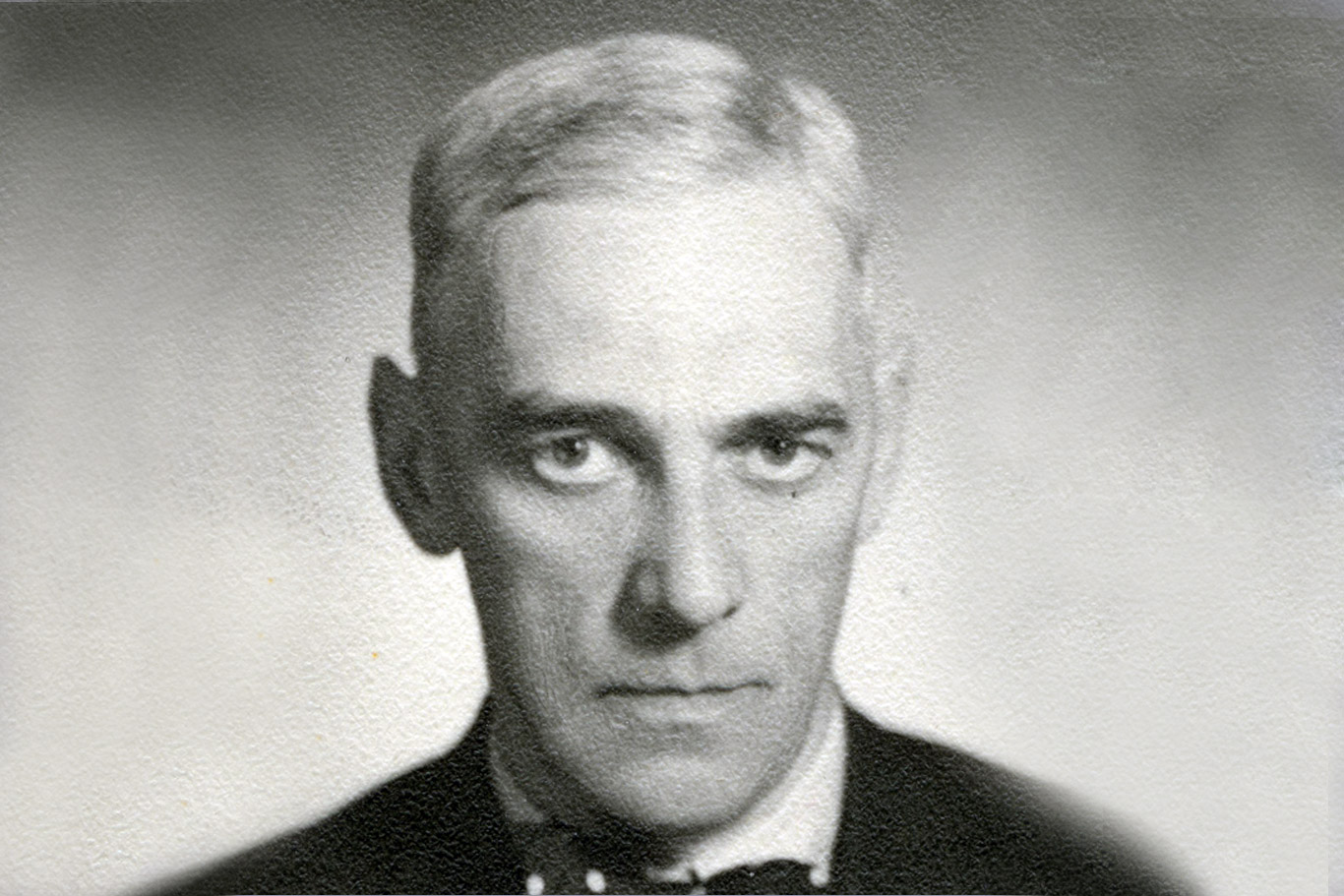
- Born: 23 March 1891; Kaunas
- Died: 4 October 1969 (aged 78); Toruń

Jerzy Hoppen (23 March 1891 – 4 October 1969) was a Polish painter, graphic artist, educator, art historian, and conservator.

He served in the Russian army and the Polish 5th Siberian Rifle Division during World War I and the Russian Revolution. Later, he settled in Vilnius, where he established the Vilnius school of graphics, working at the university and exhibiting his works both in Poland and across Europe. During World War II, he was active in the Polish resistance movement, producing false documents. In 1946, he moved to Toruń, where he began working at the university and founded the Toruń school of graphics.

== Biography ==
He was the son of Józef and Eufrozyna née Michałowska. His father was lawyer in Kaunas, later in Vilnius. In 1913, he graduated from the government gymnasium in Kaunas, where he was active in the patriotic organization "Liberation." He then began his studies at the Academy of Fine Arts in Kraków.

After the outbreak of the World War I, he interrupted his studies and left Kraków for St. Petersburg, where he pursued legal studies. At the same time, he continued studying and practicing painting. It is possible that he became involved with the Polish Military Organization during this period. In 1916, he was conscripted into the Russian army. After the creation of the Polish Army in Russia, he enlisted in the 3rd Rifle Regiment of the 5th Polish Rifle Division. He followed the division's Siberian route and was captured by the Bolsheviks in January 1920. Thanks to his artistic talent, he found employment as a theater decorator in the prisoner-of-war camp. After the signing of the Treaty of Riga, he returned to Poland and settled in Vilnius.

He became a member of the Vilnius Association of Visual Artists, taught drawing in Vilnius schools, and worked as a decorator for theaters. From August to December 1924, he studied at the Académie Colarossi in Paris. In 1925–1926, he served as the director of the Pohulanka Theater. Later, from 1929 to 1931, he was the director of the School of Artistic Crafts. In 1931, he became an assistant and the head of the Department of Graphics and Decoration at Stefan Batory University in Vilnius, while simultaneously completing his studies, which he finished in 1934. In 1937, he earned his habilitation, obtaining the title of docent. He exhibited his works in Poland and abroad, including in Warsaw, Poznań, The Hague, Copenhagen, Brussels, and Rome. He also designed banknotes for the Bank of Poland. He gained recognition as a creator of bookplates (ex libris), such as those for the University Library in Vilnius.

After Vilnius was taken by the Lithuanians in 1939 and the Polish university was closed, he began lecturing at the newly established Lithuanian Academy of Arts. He worked there until 1942, when he, along with other Poles, was dismissed from the institution. He then started working as a decorative painter for the construction company Statyba. He supervised the execution of polychrome paintings in churches, including those in Lentvaris and Perloja. At the same time, he became involved in the Polish underground resistance. At the request of Father Kazimierz Kucharski, he organized a forgery unit that produced false documents, operating within the Jesuit college in Vilnius. He worked also in his own apartment of 10th Kasztanowa Street. His close collaborators in this effort were Feliks Zaniewski, Edward Kuczyński and Michał Warakomski and others. In later years, as the unit expanded, Hoppen reduced his involvement, focusing primarily on the most complex graphic tasks.

After the Soviet forces occupied Vilnius in July 1944, he took up a position at the State Art Museum in Vilnius, while also working in the Cultural Department of the Repatriation Committee, focusing on the recovery of cultural assets for Poland. In April 1946, he moved to Toruń, where he assumed the Chair of Graphics at the Faculty of Fine Arts at Nicolaus Copernicus University. He laid the foundations for the Toruń school of graphic arts and designed the rectoral and dean's insignia for the university. He retired in 1961. Jerzy Hoppen died on 4 October 1969 and was buried in St. George's Cemetery in Toruń. In 1930, he married Maria Zaremba.

== Bibliography ==
- Niwiński, Piotr (2024). Legalizacja Okręgu Wileńskiego Armii Krajowej [Legalization of the Vilnius District of the Home Army] (in Polish). Instytut Pamięci Narodowej. ISBN 9788383760650.
