= Aleksander Paweł Sapieha =

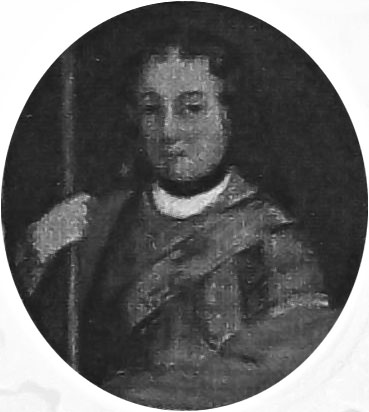
Aleksander Paweł Sapieha

Aleksander Paweł Sapieha (8 September 1672 – 4 January 1734 in Vilnius), was a Polish-Lithuanian Prince of the Sapieha family, Marshal of the Court of Lithuania (1692) and Grand Marshal of Lithuania (1699).

== Biography ==
Aleksander Paweł Sapieha was the son of Kazimierz Jan Sapieha and Krystyna Barbara Hlebowicz.

He studied at the Collegium Hosianum in Braniewo and then travelled in Europe. He returned to Poland at the end of 1689. In 1691 he married Maria Christina de Béthune, a niece of Polish Queen Marie Casimire Sobieska. He and his wife had three sons and one daughter Ludvika Maria, who married Antoni Michał Potocki. Anna Jabłonowska and Aleksander Michał Sapieha were his grandchildren.

In 1692, he took part in the Moldovan expedition of John III Sobieski and received the title of Marshal of the Court of Lithuania. He participated in the life of the court all the time, being with the dying king until the end.

During the election of a new King in 1697, he supported the candidacy of François Louis, Prince of Conti. However, Augustus II was elected the following year. Sapieha was appointed Grand Marshal of Lithuania on 27 August 1699.

In 1700, with his father and uncle, he took part in the Battle of Olkieniki, but he was forced to flee when the Lithuanian nobility, who had allied themselves against the Sapieha family, gained the upper hand.

During the Great Northern War (1700-1721), Sapieha chose the side of Charles XII of Sweden and supported his protégé, Stanislaus Leszczynski, who was elected King of Poland on 12 July 1704. In 1709, Charles XII was defeated by Peter I of Russia at Poltava.
Stanislaus Leszczynski was ousted from the Polish throne and Sapieha lost all his political functions.

In 1713, the restored King Augustus II reinstated Sapieha as Grand Marshal of Lithuania and in 1715 awarded him the Order of the white Eagle.

Aleksander Paweł Sapieha died in Vilnius on 4 January 1734.

== Sources ==
- Anatoly Gritskevich, Sapieha // Grand Duchy of Lithuania: Encyclopedia. In 3 vols. Vol. 2: Cadet Corps – Yatskevich / Ed.: G. P. Pashkov (Gal.ed.) and others; Artist Z. E. Gerasimovich. – Mn.: BelEn, 2006. −792 p.: ill. p. 549. ISBN 985-11-0315-2, ISBN 985-11-0378-0 (vol. 2) (In Russian)
- Encyklopedia PWN, Sapieha Aleksander Paweł (In Polish)
