= Antoni Michał Potocki =

Lieutenant-General

Antoni Michał Potocki (died 11 April 1766) was the Lieutenant-General of the Crown Army of Poland in 1754, voivode of Belz between 1732 and 1763, and the Lithuanian Great Deputy Master of the Pantry.

He was the son of Teresa Tarło and Aleksander Jan Potocki. In 1730 he married Ludwika Maria Sapieha, the daughter of Aleksander Paweł Sapieha and Maria Krystyna de Béthune, niece of Queen Marie Casimire. With her, he had one son, Jan Prosper Potocki.

In 1733 he was a signatory to the election of Stanisław Leszczyński as king of Poland and Grand Duke of Lithuania. In 1744 he published Do Panów obojga stanów in which he recommended reforms, especially that of allowing city-dwellers a more active political role.

In 1726 he was awarded the Order of St. Alexander Nevsky, in 1745 the Order of the White Eagle, in 1730 Order of St. Andrew.
