= Kazimierz Jan Sapieha =

Grand Hetman of Lithuania (1642–1720)

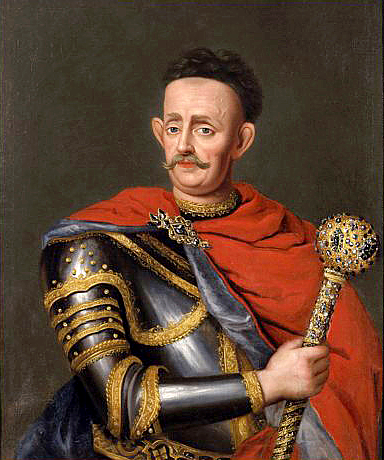
Portrait, 18th century

Kazimierz Jan Paweł Sapieha (Lithuanian: Jonas Kazimieras Sapiega jaunesnysis; 1637–1720) was a grand hetman of Lithuania commencing in 1682. In 1681, he became Field Hetman of Lithuania, the following year he also became the voivode of Vilnius. He held the title of duke starting in 1700.

Kazimierz Jan Sapieha is the son of Paweł Jan Sapieha and Anna Barbara Kopeć.

He commanded the Grand Ducal Lithuanian Army contingent of the military of the Polish–Lithuanian Commonwealth during the campaign to lift the Siege of Vienna by the Ottoman Turks. When the main Polish Army under the King of Poland John III Sobieski, who was nominated the Supreme Commander of the Holy League, marched on Vienna and played a decisive role in the battle, it left Poland undefended. As a result, the Lithuanian troops were drawn into a fight along the southern Polish border tying down the anti-Habsburg Hungarian Kuruc forces under the vassal king of Upper Hungary, Emeric Thököly, along the border between Upper Hungary and Poland.

This punitive action on the edge of the overall campaign was successful in keeping these irregular Hungarian troops (bolstered with Ottoman levies) from either raiding into Poland or coming to the assistance of the besieging Ottoman Army when the Holy League attacked their positions outside Vienna on 12 September 1683. He was meant to break off his attack along the Hungarian border and participate in the battle but by the time he arrived in Vienna at the head of the Lithuanian Army, the battle had already ended.

He was the founder of Sapieha Palace in Vilnius, which was designed by Pietro Perti from Italy.

== Marriage and children ==
Kazimierz Sapieha first married Krystyna Barbara Hlebowicz who gave him four children:

- Jerzy Stanisław (1668-1732), Grand Panetier of Lithuania
- Michał Franciszek (1670-1700), General
- Aleksander Paweł (1672-1734), Grand Marshal of Lithuania
- Katarzyna

He then married Teresa Korwin Gosiewska for his second, and Antonina Sybilla Waldstein-Arnau for his third wife.
