= Palace of the Grand Dukes of Lithuania =

Palace in Vilnius, Lithuania

- Lietuvos Didžiosios Kunigaikštystės valdovų rūmai (Lithuanian)
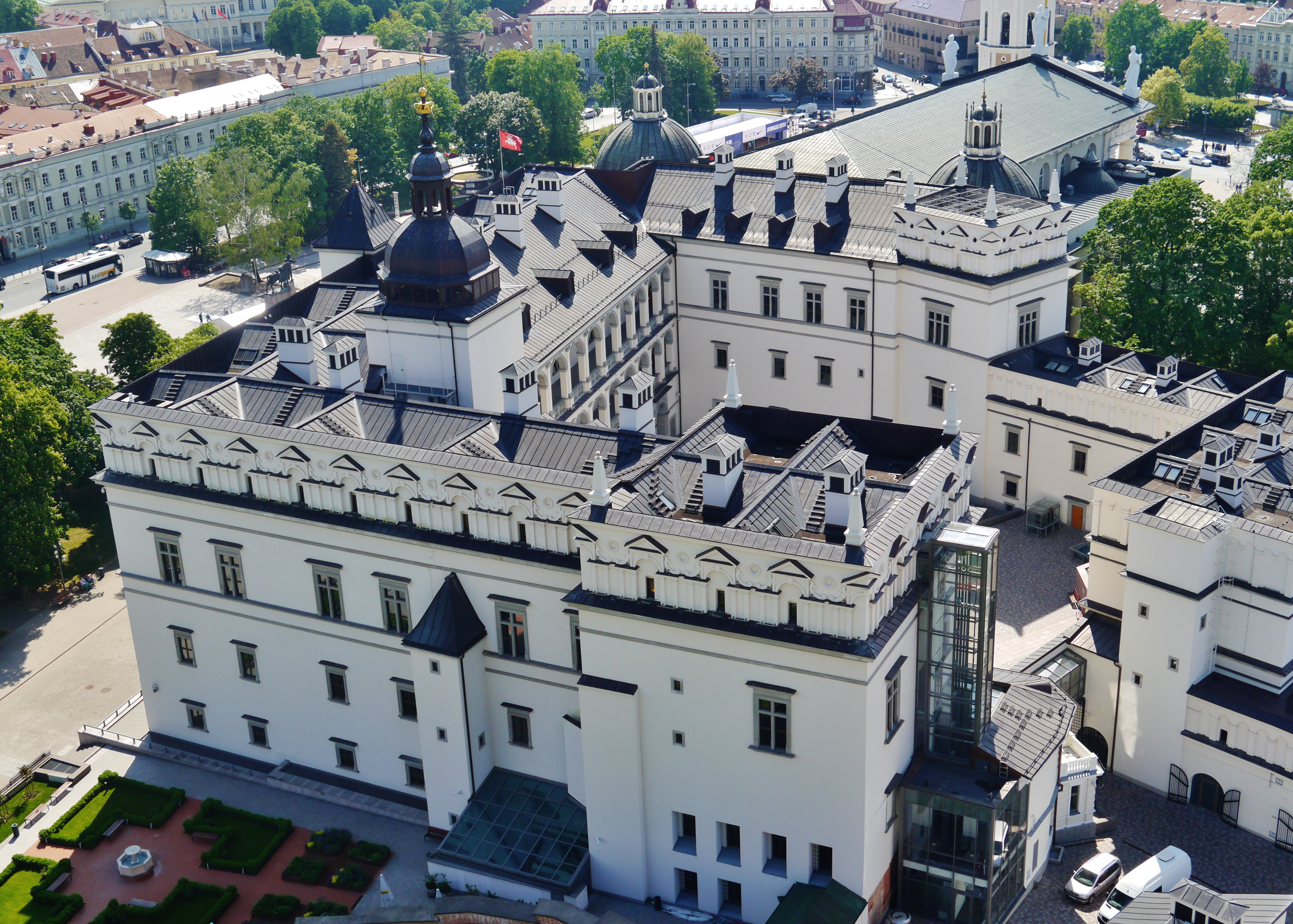
- Aerial view of the palace from Gediminas' Tower

- Location within Lithuania
- Interactive map of Palace of the Grand Dukes of Lithuania
- 54.6862°N 25.2890°E
- Type: Residental palace
- Location: Vilnius, Lithuania

History
- Built: 15th and 16th centuries
- Rebuilt: 2002-2009

Site notes
- Architect(s): Bernardinus Zanobi da Gianotti, Giovani Cini, Matteo Castelli, Peter Nonhart, W. Pohli, Costante Tencalla, Jacopo Tencalla, Napaleonas Kitkauskas, Rimas Grigas
- Architectural styles: Gothic, Renaissance, Early Baroque
- Owner: The National Museum of Palace of the Grand Dukes of Lithuania

UNESCO World Heritage Site
- Official name: Vilnius Old Town
- Type: Cultural
- Criteria: II, IV
- Designated: 1994 (18th session)
- Reference no.: 541
- Country: Lithuania
- Region: Europe and North America

Cultural Monuments of Lithuania
- Type: National
- Designated: 20 November 2001
- Reference no.: 24709

The Palace of the Grand Dukes of Lithuania (Lithuanian: Lietuvos Didžiosios Kunigaikštystės valdovų rūmai Vilniaus žemutinėje pilyje) (Note: in other languages also known as: Latin: Palatium Magnorum Ducum Lithuaniae, Ukrainian: Палац великих князів литовських, Polish: Zamek Dolny w Wilnie, Belarusian: Палац вялікіх князёў літоўскіх, Italian: Palazzo dei Granduchi di Lituania, German: Palast der Großfürsten von Litauen.) is a palace in Vilnius, Lithuania. It was originally constructed in the 15th century for the rulers of the Grand Duchy of Lithuania and the future Kings of Poland. The palace, located in the lower castle of Vilnius, evolved over the years and prospered during the 16th and mid-17th centuries. For four centuries the palace was one of the political, administrative and cultural centres of the Polish–Lithuanian Commonwealth. It was demolished in 1801.

Work on a new palace started in 2002 on the site of the original building and it took 16 years to complete it in 2018. The palace was rebuilt in a Renaissance style. According to the testimony of one of the couriers of Bona Sforza such initial reconstruction from 1520 to 1530 cost 100,000 gold ducats and was ordered by Sigismund I the Old. It is believed that the 16th century reconstruction was made for the proclamation ceremony of Sigismund II Augustus, son of Sigismund I the Old, as the Grand Duke of Lithuania.

== History ==
=== Grand Duchy of Lithuania ===
Vilnius Castle Complex in 1740. Upper Castle: 1. Western tower (Gediminas Tower); 2. Southern tower (foundations remaining); 3. Palace (ruins remaining) Lower Castle: 4. Gates and bridge to the city (Pilies Street); 5. Road and bridge to a Tilto Street; 6. Cathedral; 7. Palace of Supreme Tribunal; 8. Palace of bishops; 9. Royal Palace; 10. Palace garden; 11. Palace building, arsenal since the late 18th century, currently museum; 12. North-eastern tower and gates of arsenal; 13. Yard of arsenal

In the 13th and 14th centuries there were stone structures within the palace site; some archaeologists believe that a wooden palace stood there as well. The stone palace was built in the 15th century, apparently after a major fire in 1419. The existing stone buildings and defensive structures of the lower castle, which blocked the construction, were demolished. The palace was built in Gothic style. The keep of the upper castle, as well as the palace, were meant to host the coronation of Vytautas the Great. The Gothic palace had three wings; research suggests that it was a two-story building with a basement.

Grand Duke Alexander Jagiellon, who later became King of Poland, moved his residence to the palace, where he met with ambassadors. He ordered the renovation of it. After his marriage to a daughter of Moscow's Grand Duke Ivan III, the royal couple lived and died in there.

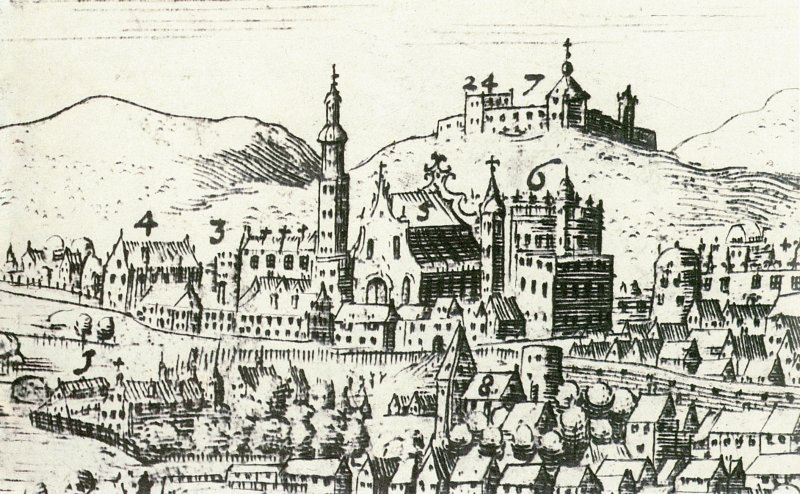
The Palace of the Grand Dukes (marked as number 6) in Vilnius Lower Castle in the late 16th century.

Sigismund I the Old, after his ascension to the grand ducal throne, conducted his affairs in the palace as well as in Vilnius Cathedral. During the rule of Sigismund I the palace was greatly expanded to meet the new needs of the grand duke. Another wing was added, as well as a third floor, and the gardens were extended. By contemporary accounts the palace was worth 100,000 ducats. The palace reconstruction plan was probably prepared by the Italian architect Bartolomeo Berrecci da Pontassieve, who also designed several other projects in the Kingdom of Poland. In this palace Sigismund the Old welcomed an emissary from the Holy Roman Empire, who introduced Sigismund to Bona Sforza, his second wife, in 1517.

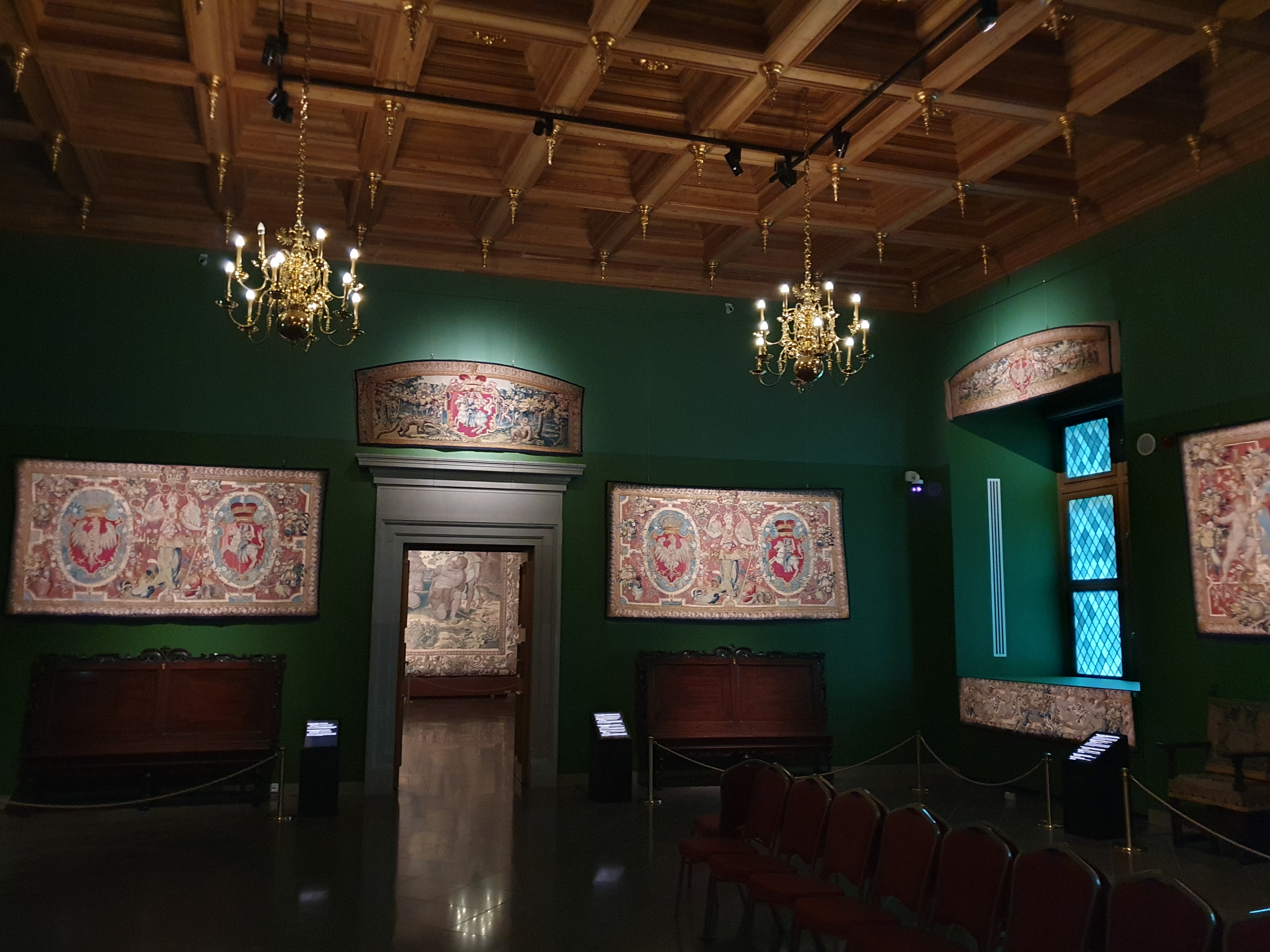
Palace interior decorated with authentic 16th century Flemish tapestries, which were commissioned by Sigismund II Augustus and historically were used in the authentic palace. They were transported from the Wawel Castle for an exhibition in 2023.

Sigismund's son, Sigismund II Augustus, was crowned Grand Duke of Lithuania in the palace in 1529. Sigismund II carried on with the development work and lived there with his first wife Elisabeth of Austria, daughter of Ferdinand I, Holy Roman Emperor. She was laid to rest in Vilnius Cathedral. Sigismund II's second wife, Barbara Radziwiłł, also lived in the palace. According to contemporary accounts of the Holy See's emissary, the palace at that time contained more treasures than the Vatican. Sigismund II also assembled one of the largest collection of books and tapestries in Europe.

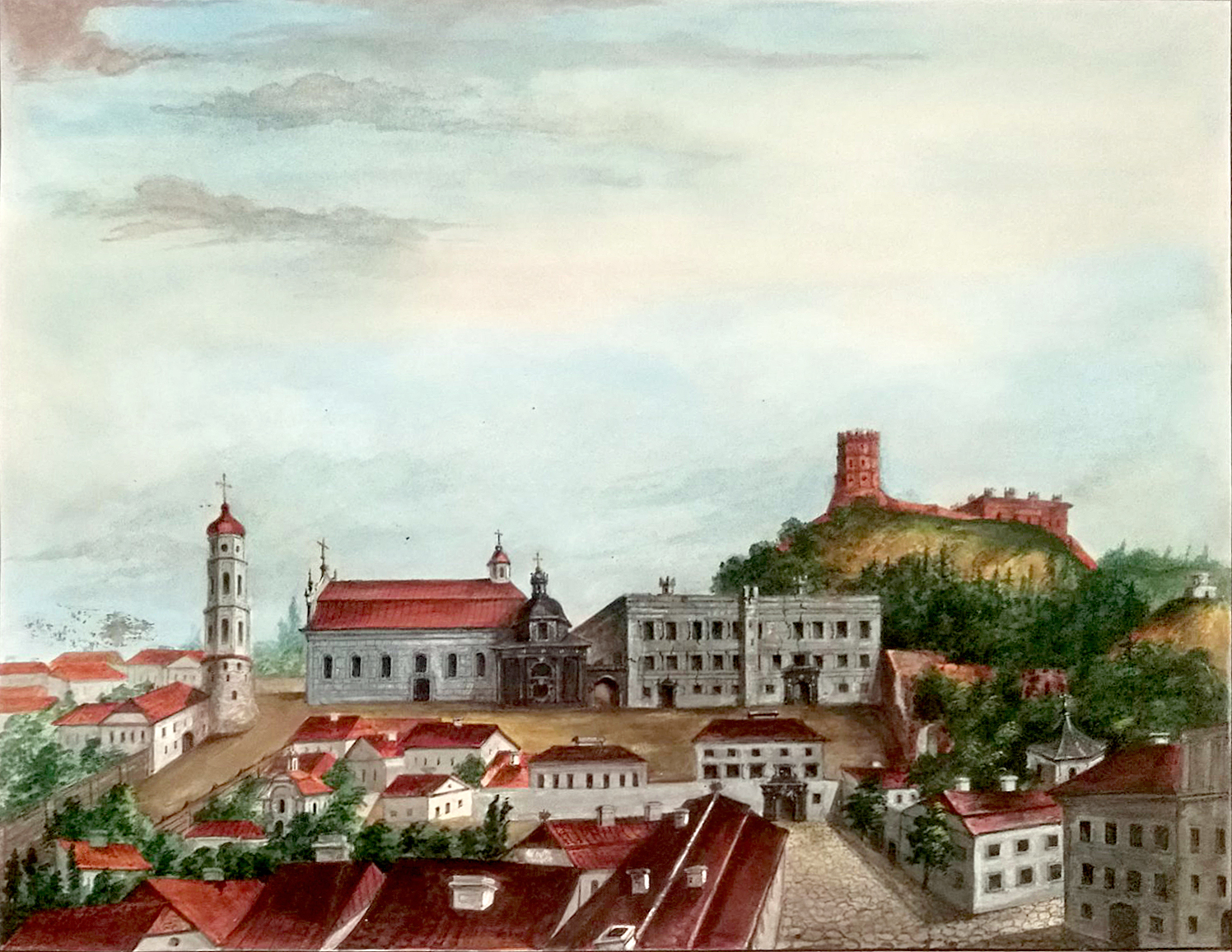
Panorama of the Vilnius Castle Complex in 1796

The palace was remodelled in the Renaissance style in the 16th century. The plan was prepared by several Italian architects, including Giovanni Cini da Siena, Bernardino de Gianotis, and others. The palace was visited by Ippolito Aldobrandini, who later became Pope Clement VIII. Another major development took place during the reign of the House of Vasa. The palace was refurbished in the early Baroque style during the rule of Sigismund III Vasa. Matteo Castello, Giacopo Tencalla, and other artists participated in the 17th-century renovation.

During the Vasa rule, several notable ceremonies took place, including the wedding of Duke John, who later became King John III of Sweden, and Sigismund Augustus' sister Catherine. The first opera in Lithuania was staged in the palace in 1634. Marco Scacchi and Virgilio Puccitelli were the opera's impresarios.

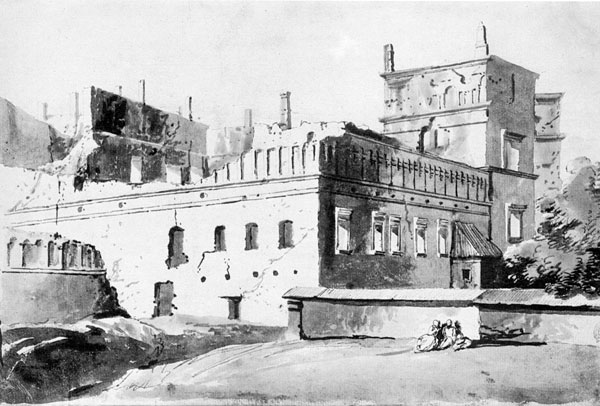
The ruins of the palace, drawn between 1785 and 1786.

After the Russian invasion in 1655, the state began to weaken, and that also affected the castle. In August 1655, Vilnius was captured by the Muscovite army. The Grand Ducal Lithuanian Army recaptured the city six years later, by which time the palace had been destroyed by fire. The palace was greatly damaged and its treasures were plundered. After the recapture of the city of Vilnius in 1660–1661, the palace was no longer a suitable state residence, and stood abandoned for about 150 years. In the late 18th century, after the fall of the Polish–Lithuanian Commonwealth, several families lived in parts of the ruined palace. Soon after the Grand Duchy of Lithuania was incorporated into the Russian Empire, officials ordered the demolition of the remaining sections of the palace. The structure was almost completely demolished in 1801, the bricks and stones were sold, and the site was bowered.

=== After demolition of the palace ===
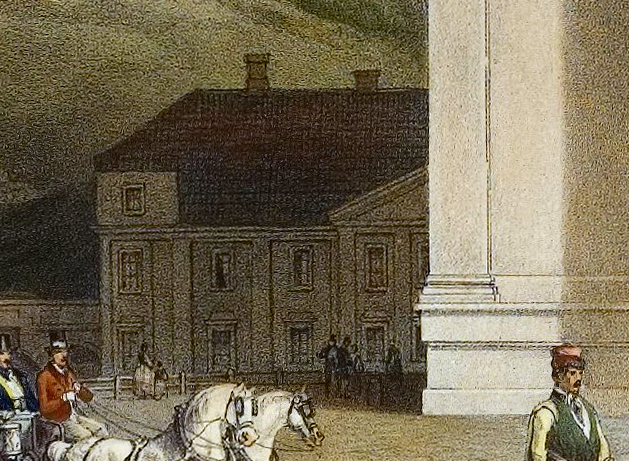
Schlossberg's house northern side by 1848

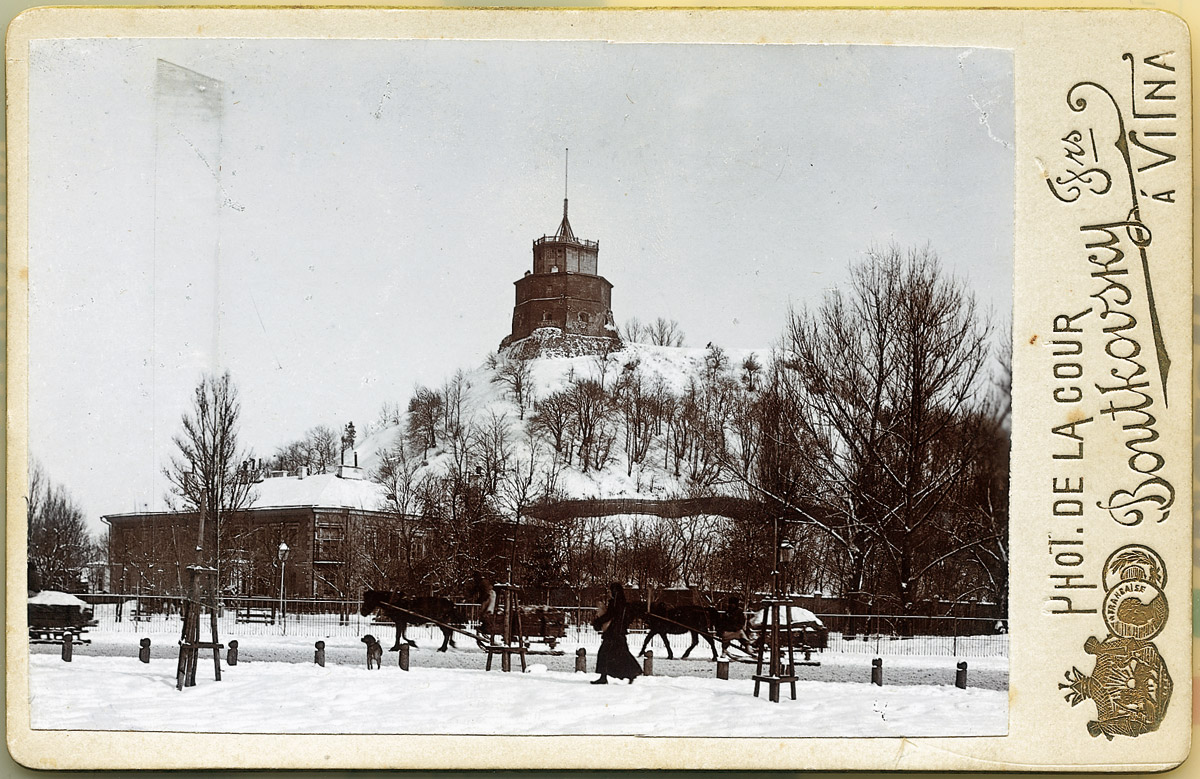
Schlossberg's house and Castle Hill by the end of 19th century

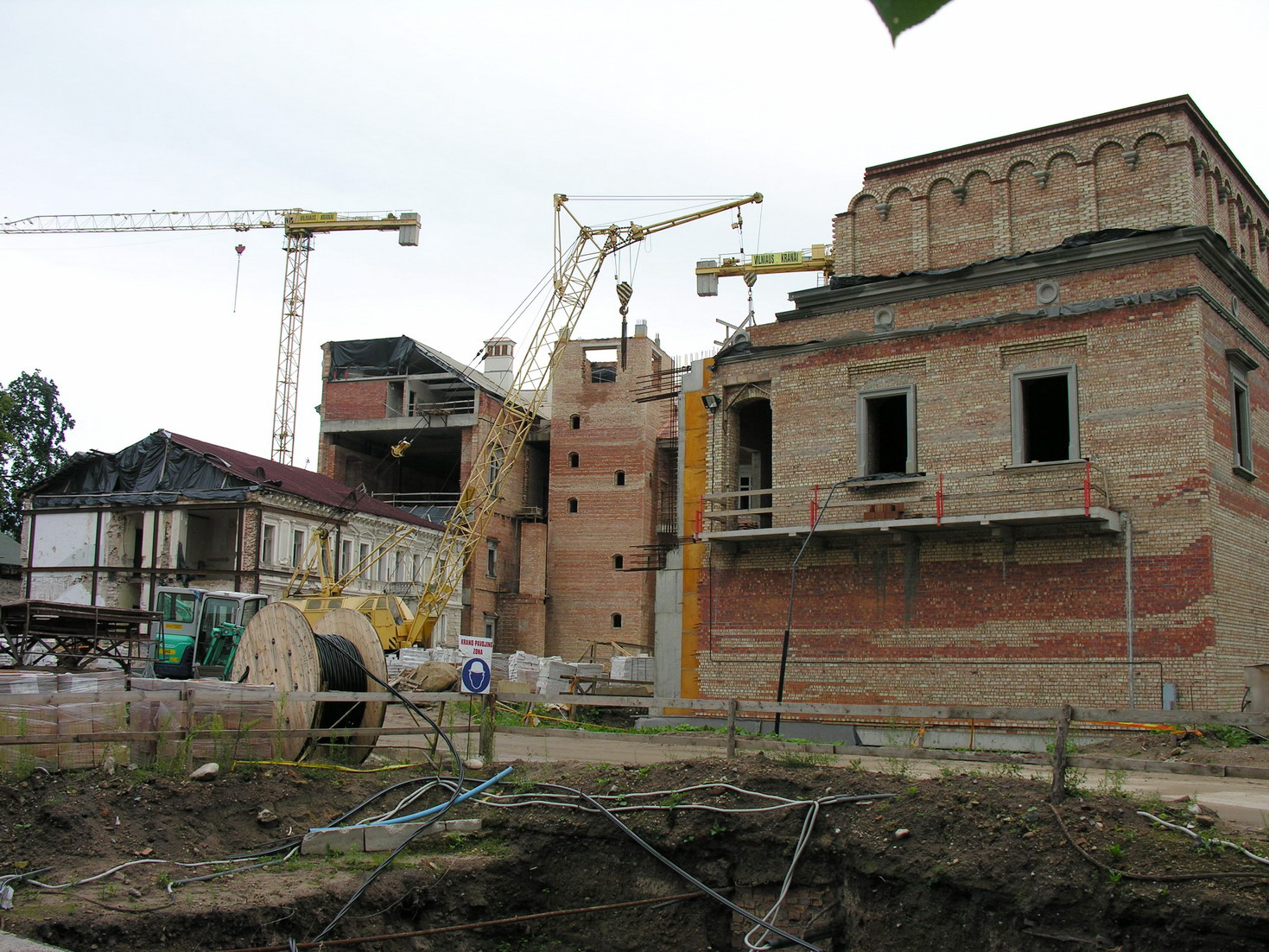
Schlossberg's house in the reconstruction site by 2006

Only a small portion of the walls up to the second floor in the eastern wing survived, that were sold to the Jewish merchant Abraham Schlossberg around 1800, who incorporated them into his house. After the November uprising of 1831, Schlossberg's house had been bought and taken over by Imperial Russian Army, which had presence in arsenals nearby. As Vilnius fortress was established, the building became part of the fortress, which by itself was surrounded by the ditch. The Schlossberg's house in 1840 Vilnius map is named as barracks (Polish: Koszary). By the end of 19th century the fortress' ditch on former palace's site was covered with soil and turned into the city's park.

After Lithuania regained its independence following World War I in 1918, the Schlossberg's house became the headquarters of the army. It soon was captured by Polish troops following the Polish annexation of Vilnius. During World War II, it was the office of the German Wehrmacht, and after World War II it was used by Soviet security structures and later transformed into a Respublican Pioneers Palace. Pioneers' organisation vacated the building by the 1987. Archeological excavations started on the site, because Schlossberg's house was proposed for the People's Friendship Museum and for this conversion architectural investigation were needed to take place.

Sporadic archeological excavations took place already in 1964, when works for installation of central heating system in Schlossberg's house has been undertaken.

=== Reconstruction ===
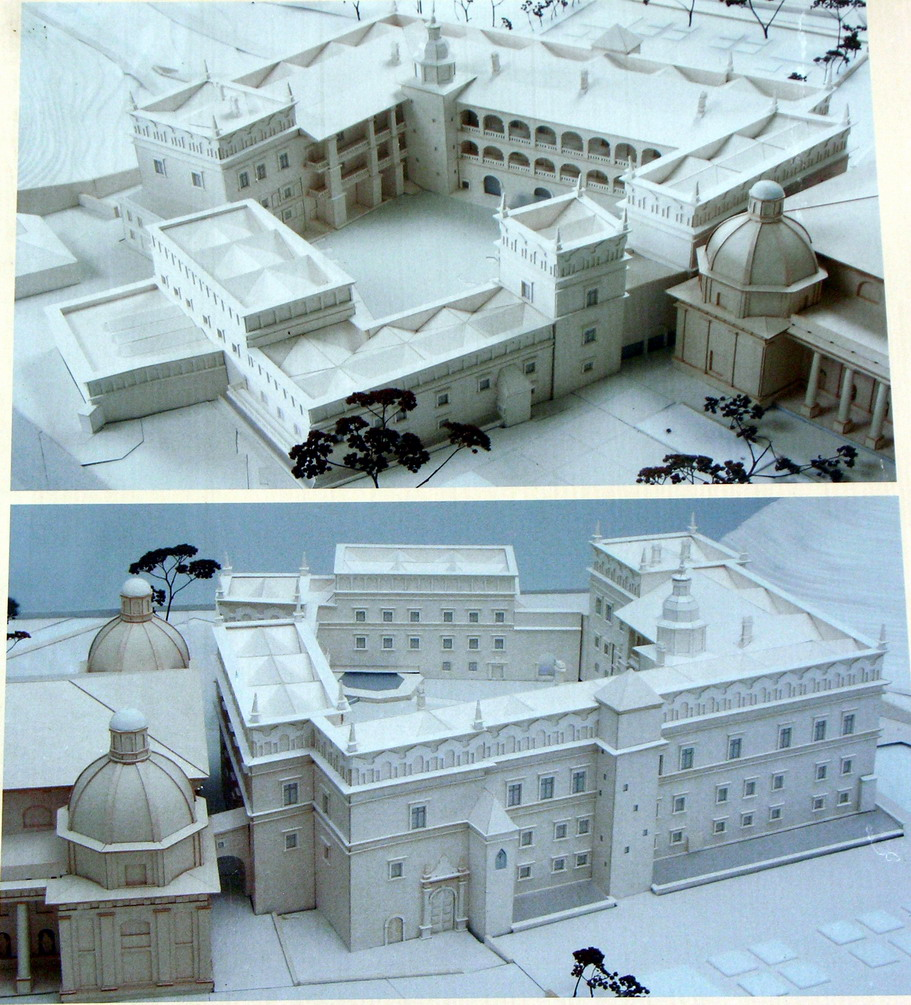
Rimas Grigas' winning design in 2004

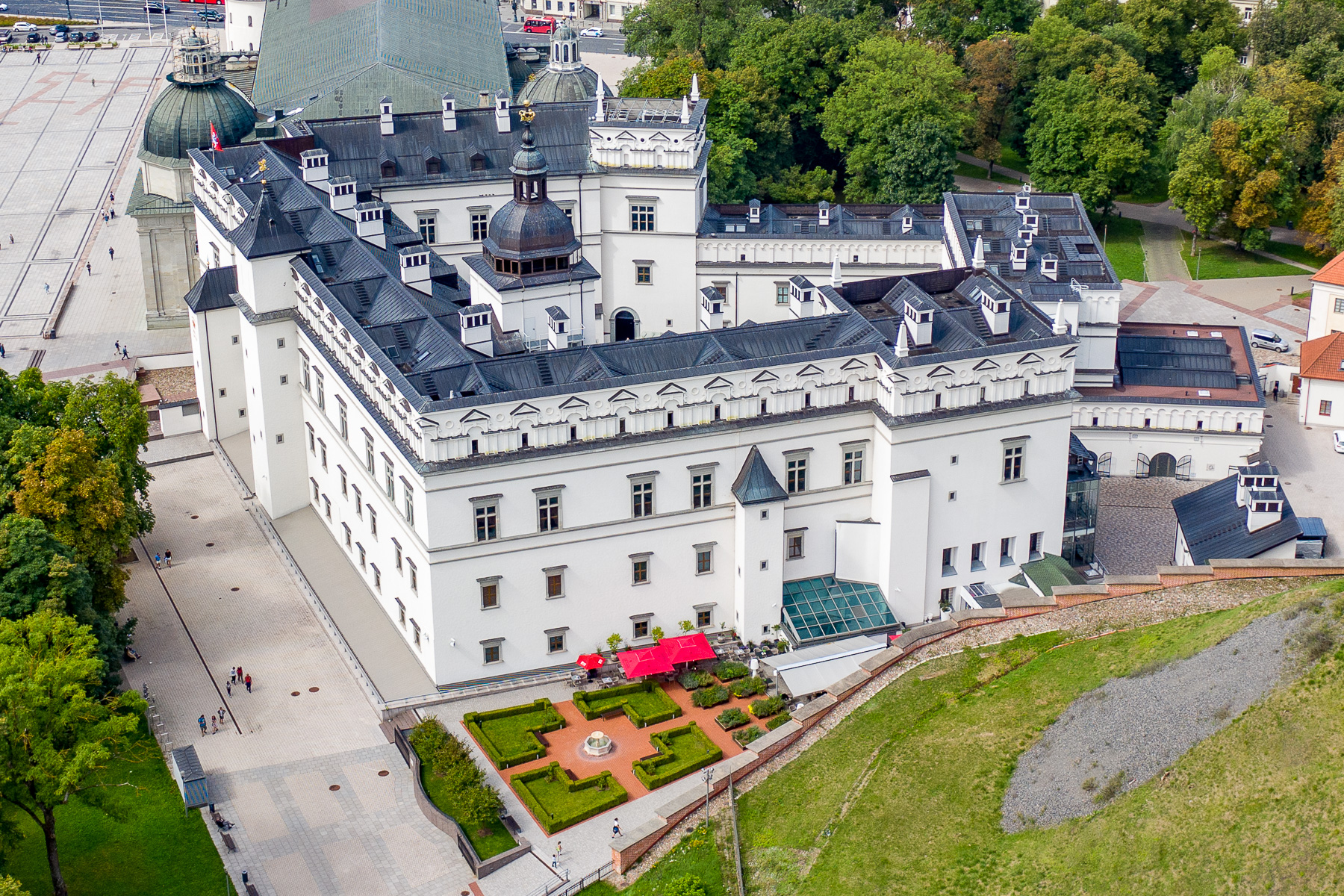
Aerial photography from the side of the Gediminas Tower in 2023

After the fall of the Iron Curtain, in 1990 Lithuania became independent again. In 1994 archeological excavations were put on hold due lack of funding. In 1994 Lithuanian Institute of History established Castles' Investigation Group that supervised archeological excavations. Schlossberg's house was used as Group's headquarters and housed collection of archaeological material found on the site.

By the end of 1980s archeological excavations covered more and more territory, exposure of excavated basements to environmental factors (e. g. weather) led to decay of the materials (in particular, wooden structures and bricks). To solve this problem, it was decided in 1988 to erect temporary buildings – greenhouses (also as known as "hangars" due to their brownish colour and shape of these buildings). By early 1990s three options of palace site's future were circulating in the public. The first option was about covering excavated basements of the palace with soil, but it was deemed to be uneconomical. The second option was to erect a purpose-built building on palace's site to conserve the ruins, but opponents of this option noted possible visual pollution of the Vilnius Old Town (as it was included in the UNESCO World Heritage List in 1994). The third option was to construct a building similar to the original one. The latter option received the most attention from politicians and was lobbied by the then President of Lithuania Algirdas Brazauskas. In 1993, an architectural design competition was held and out of seven projects Rimas Grigas' design won the competition.

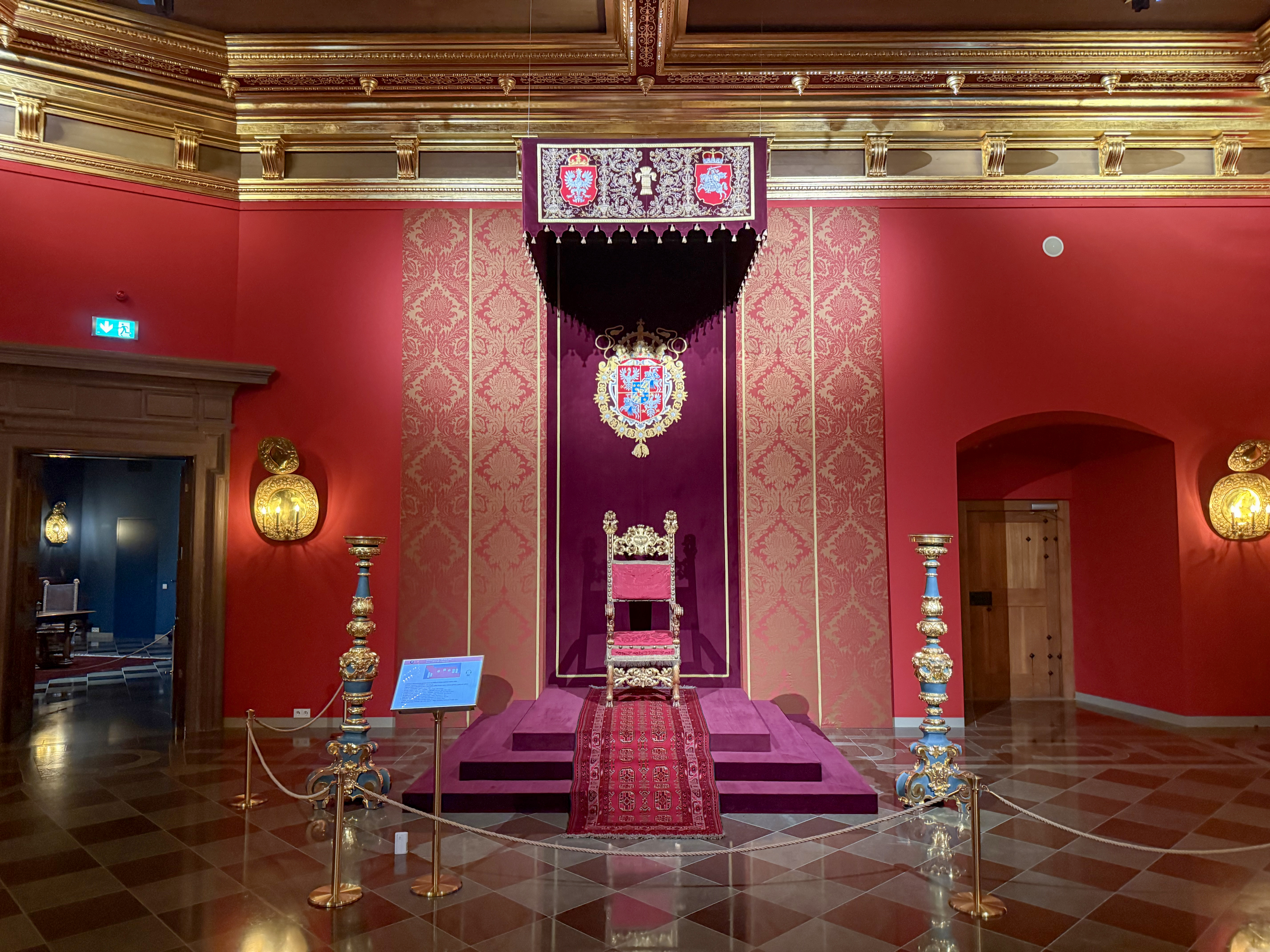
Throne Room inside the palace

By the first half of 1990s, the question of the palace's function in the future was raised. Initially, the palace was proposed as the future Presidential Palace, but the Artists' Palace had been used in that function instead. By the end of the decade, Kazys Napoleonas Kitkauskas suggested to use the palace as the National Gallery of Art (building of former Museum of Revolution has been used instead since 2009). In 1999, the Lithuanian Art Museum stated that palace's building would be used as residential palace museum. Kazys Napoleonas Kitkauskas was the scientific director of the palace's restoration project.

As part of a programme of nation-building, the Seimas in 2000 passed a law to reconstruct the palace. Ground was broken in summer of 2002 on the southern part of the site of the original building. By 2002–2004 and 2005–2006 the palace project was changed mainly due to archeological findings found on the site and discussions about the architectural value of Schlossberg's house. Fragments of Schlossberg's house became part of the eastern wing of the restored palace. The building (and museum that was planned to own the building) was partially opened during the celebration of the millennium of the name of Lithuania in summer of 2009, although it was not yet fully completed due to lack of funding. By the end of July 2009, construction work resumed and the building again became inaccessible for the public.

Several historians who were against the reconstruction provided many arguments why the reconstruction of the palace was unnecessary. It was argued that the newly built palace would destroy the urban landscape formed over the last 300 years. Vilnius Cathedral would be overshadowed by the palace, and the Gediminas' Tower would not be visible from the side of the cathedral. Also it was noted that materials and technologies unknown at the time of original construction (e. g. reinforced concrete) have been used. Also the reconstruction was financed by the state, while many authentic historic buildings (mainly manor houses) are in critical condition.

On 23 May 2013, the part of the palace known as Bloc A was officially finished. On 6 July 2013, it was officially opened to the public, 760 years after the coronation of Mindaugas. From 2014 to 2018 the part of the palace known as Bloc B was under construction. The Bloc B and the museum building as a whole opened on the 6 July 2018.

A valuable paintings collection of Italian 15th-17th centuries painters was donated or loaned for exhibiting to the palace by Lithuanian businessman Pranas Kiznis.

=== Presidency of the Council of the European Union in 2013 ===
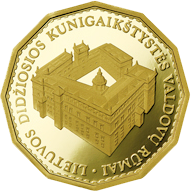
Litas golden coin dedicated to the palace

During Lithuania's presidency of the Council of the European Union, the palace was used as one of the main venues for the meetings of heads of European countries.

On 28 November 2013, during the Eastern Partnership Summit in Vilnius, a dinner was held in the palace with many guests, including German Chancellor Angela Merkel; British Prime Minister David Cameron; French President François Hollande; Polish President Bronisław Komorowski; European Council President Herman Van Rompuy; European Commission President José Manuel Barroso; European Parliament President Martin Schulz; European Commission Vice-President and High Representative of the Union for Foreign Affairs and Security Policy Baroness Catherine Ashton; Commissioner for Enlargement and European Neighbourhood Policy Štefan Füle; Commissioner for Trade Karel De Gucht; the presidents of Latvia, Cyprus, Romania and Slovakia; the Prime Ministers of Czech Republic, Denmark, Estonia, Greece, Italy, Croatia, Luxembourg, Malta, the Netherlands, Portugal, Slovenia, Sweden, Hungary and Spain; as well as other high-ranking officials.

Countries participating in the Eastern Partnership programme was represented at the summit by Armenian President Serzh Sargsyan, Azerbaijani President Ilham Aliyev, Ukrainian President Viktor Yanukovych, Georgian President Giorgi Margvelashvili, Moldovan Prime Minister Iurie Leancă, and Belarusian Foreign Minister Vladimir Makei.

President Yanukovych was expected to sign the European Union–Ukraine Association Agreement at the palace but the signing did not take place, stating threats and demands from Russia. Yanukovych's refusal to sign the agreement led to the Euromaidan.

=== Recent history ===
On 17 September 2020 - For the first time in more than 200 years, a joint session of the Lithuanian and Polish governments was held at the Palace, chaired by the Prime Minister of Lithuania, Saulius Skvernelis, and the Prime Minister of Poland, Mateusz Morawiecki. On 11–12 July 2023, a gala reception for Vilnius NATO Summit delegates was held in the Grand Courtyard of the Palace.

== Building ==
=== South wing ===
This wing has three floors. Originally, this wing was used for audiences of foreign ambassadors.

=== East wing ===
This wing has three floors (except two floor annexes). This wing contains the oldest remnants of the original palace above current ground level. It also the only wing to feature eclecticist architecture (former Schlossberg's house). Originally, this wing hosted the grand duchess' apartments.

=== West wing ===
This wing has two (northernmost part) and three floors. Originally, this wing housed the grand duke's apartments.

=== North wing ===
This wing mostly has two floors. Originally, this wing was used as the servants' quarters. It also housed the palace theatre.
