= Tencalla =

Tencalla is a surname. Notable people with the surname include:

- Carpoforo Tencalla (1623–1685), Swiss-Italian Baroque painter
- Costante Tencalla (1593–1646), Swiss-Italian architect and sculptor
- Giovanni Pietro Tencalla (1629–1702), Swiss architect
