= Napaleonas Kitkauskas =

Lithuanian architect (1931–2026)

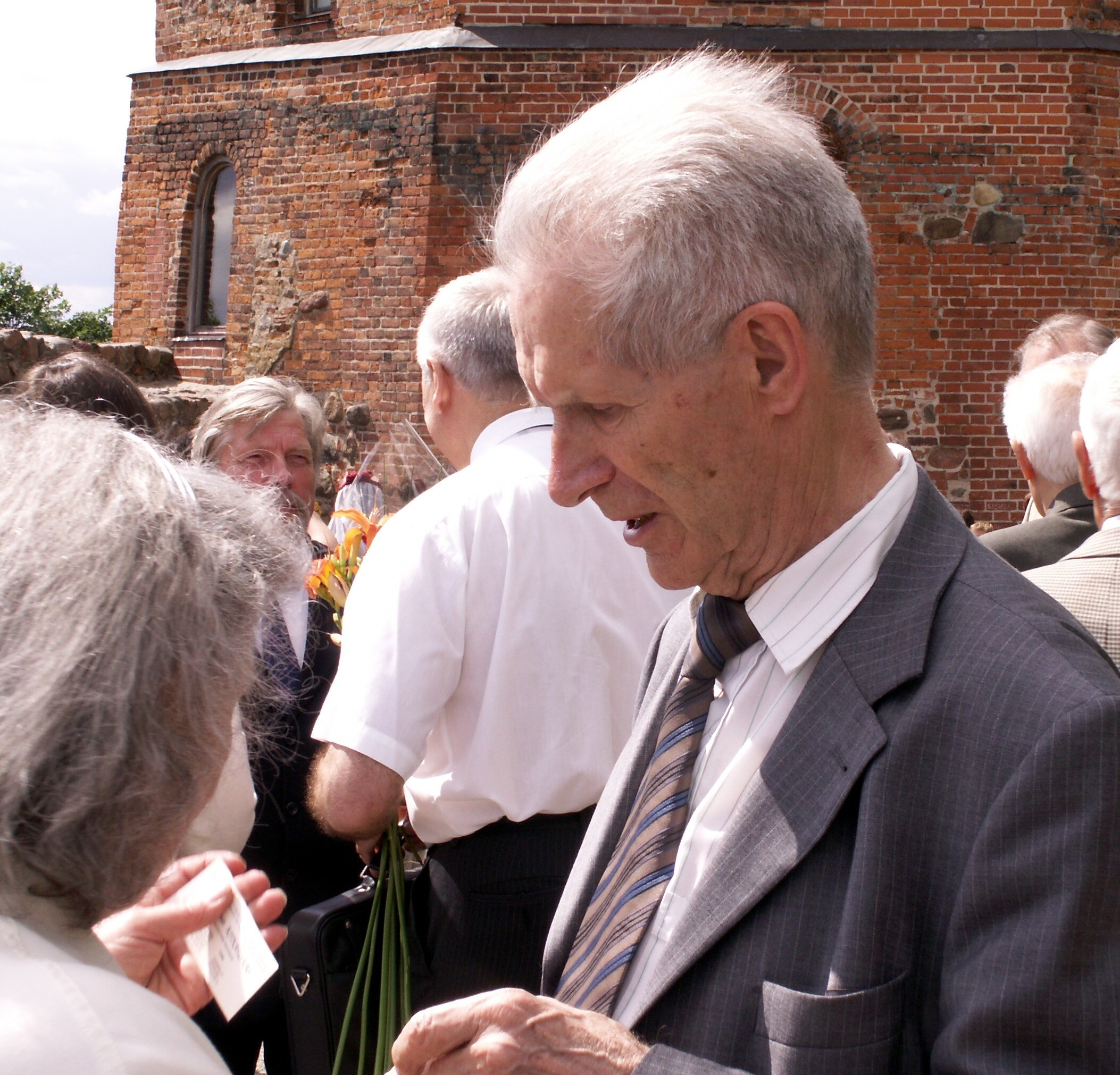
Napalys Kitkauskas, Historian of Lithuania

Kazys Napoleonas Kitkauskas (5 January 1931 – 16 November 2026) was a Lithuanian restoration architect, construction engineer and cultural activist. He was well known for his archeological research of the Vilnius Castle Complex and was the scientific director of the restoration project of the Palace of the Grand Dukes of Lithuania.

Kitkauskas died on 16 November 2026, at the age of 95.

== Awards ==
- 1990: Lithuanian National Prize
- 1995: Officer's Cross of the Order of the Lithuanian Grand Duke Gediminas
- 1999: Commander's Cross of the Order of the Lithuanian Grand Duke Gediminas
