= Bernardino de Gianotis =

Italian sculptor and architect

Bernardino de Gianotis (called Romanus; died 1541, Vilnius) was an Italian sculptor and architect active in the Kingdom of Poland and the Grand Duchy of Lithuania. He is best known for his sculptural works; primarily tombstones for Polish and Lithuanian rulers and magnates. His most well-known architectural works are the reconstructions of the cathedrals in Płock (1531–34) and Vilnius (1534–41) after fires. Since 1539 he also led the reconstruction and enlargement of the Palace of the Grand Dukes of Lithuania in Vilnius, however he died before it was finished.

== Biography ==
=== Early life and work ===
Although called "Romanus," he probably came from Florence, as he is occasionally referred to as "Florentinus," and his brother is called John of Florence. The nickname was probably due to his long stay in Rome and receiving his education there. He arrived in Poland in 1517.

=== Kraków (c. 1524 to 1537) ===
Bernardino Zanobi de Gianotis was first working in Poland as a member of Bartolomeo Berrecci's group erecting the Sigismund Chapel in Kraków's Wawel Castle since 1524. It's possible that previously since 1519 worked together with Giovanni Cini of Siena on the construction of the canopy of the tomb of King Władysław Jagiełło. Cini and de Gianotis are credited with the construction of the so-called Zator altar in the Chapel of Queen Sophia in the Wawel Cathedral. On commission from Duchess Anna of Mazovia he made the tombstone of the Mazovian Dukes brothers Stanisław and Janusz at St. John's Collegiate Church in Warsaw in the years 1526–28.

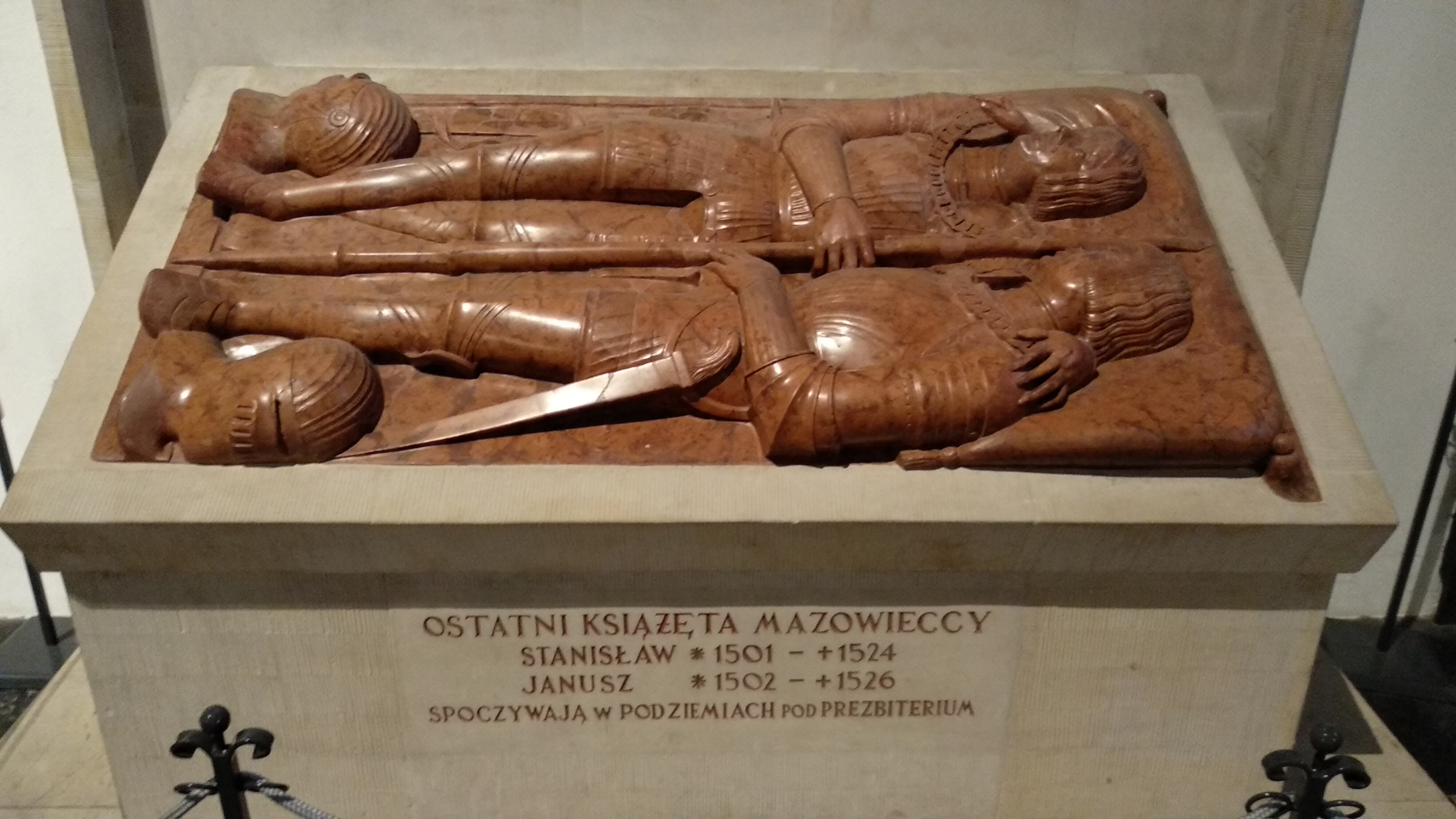
Tombstone of the Mazovian princes Stanisław and Janusz at St. John's Collegiate Church in Warsaw

He left Berrecci's workshop in mid-1529, upon completion of the work on Sigismund Chapel, and remained in Poland, possibly taking up work on the tomb chapel of Bishop Piotr Tomicki at Wawel Castle. Later, he worked together with Giovanni Cini and Filippo da Fiesole, with whom he established a workshop in Kraków. In December 1531, he signed a contract with Bishop Andrzej Krzycki for the reconstruction of Płock Cathedral, which lasted in years 1532–34. After its construction, it was the first church building of the Renaissance style.

In 1534, the three partners erected a brickyard in Przegorzały near Kraków in 1534. On 22 July 1534, de Gianotis concluded an agreement with Bishop John of the Lithuanian Dukes in which he pledged to rebuild Vilnius Cathedral in years 1536–1540. The old cathedral was burned down in July 1530. At the beginning of 1535, the company undertook the reconstruction of the tenement house of canon Andrzej Zebrzydowski, later bishop of Kraków. Work continues until the middle of the year. On 30 July 1535, de Gianotis signed a contract with Rev. Maciej of Jeżów for the erection of two tombstones for chamberlain Stanisław Lasocki and "eius parentis" and a baptistery in the parish church in Brzeziny.

At the same time, de Gianotis made a new tombstone commissioned by Queen Bona Sforza for Grand Duke Alexander Vytautas (died in 1430), which was to be placed in the new cathedral. Unfortunately, the tombstone has not survived to our time. It was probably in a similar style to de Gianotis' other works, most notably the tombstone of Albertas Goštautas. The tombstone was made in Kraków and arrived in Vilnius in 1535. It was probably not set up until 1573 by the Bishop Walerian Protasewicz. Bernardino de Gianotis is also credited with the tombstones of Krzysztof Szydłowiecki and his daughter Anna from the collegiate church in Opatów. He was also the probable author of the tombstone of Bishop Jan Konarski from the Wawel Cathedral from 1521, and the tombstone of Bishop Jan Lubrański from the Poznań Cathedral from the years 1522–25.

=== Vilnius (1537 to 1541) ===
It is likely that he has been residing permanently in Vilnius since 1537, and his interests in Kraków were represented by associates. At that time, de Gianotis was working on the reconstruction of the royal palace in the lower castle in Vilnius. In 1540, Filippo da Fiesole died. The following year, Bernardino de Gianotis died, which led to the dissolution of the architecture and sculpture company. The reconstruction of the palace in Vilnius was finished under the leadership of Gianotis' colleague Giovani Cini. Gianotis left behind two minor children, Jan and Anna.

== Bibliography ==
- Janicki, Marek A. (2020). "Grób i komemoracja wielkiego księcia Aleksandra Witolda w katedrze wileńskiej w kontekście upamiętnienia Władysława Jagiełły w katedrze krakowskiej i propagandy jagiellońskiej XIV–XVI w." [The tomb and commemoration of Grand Duke Alexander Vytautas in Vilnius Cathedral in the context of the commemoration of Władysław Jagiełło in Kraków Cathedral and 14th-16th century Jagiellonian propaganda]. Przegląd Historyczny. 111 (4).
- Kozakiewiczowa, Helena (1959). "Spółka architektoniczno-rzeźbiarska Bernardina de Gianotis i Jana Cini". Biuletyn Historii Sztuki. 21 (2): 151–174. doi:10.11588/diglit.41528.24.
