= Giovanni Cini =

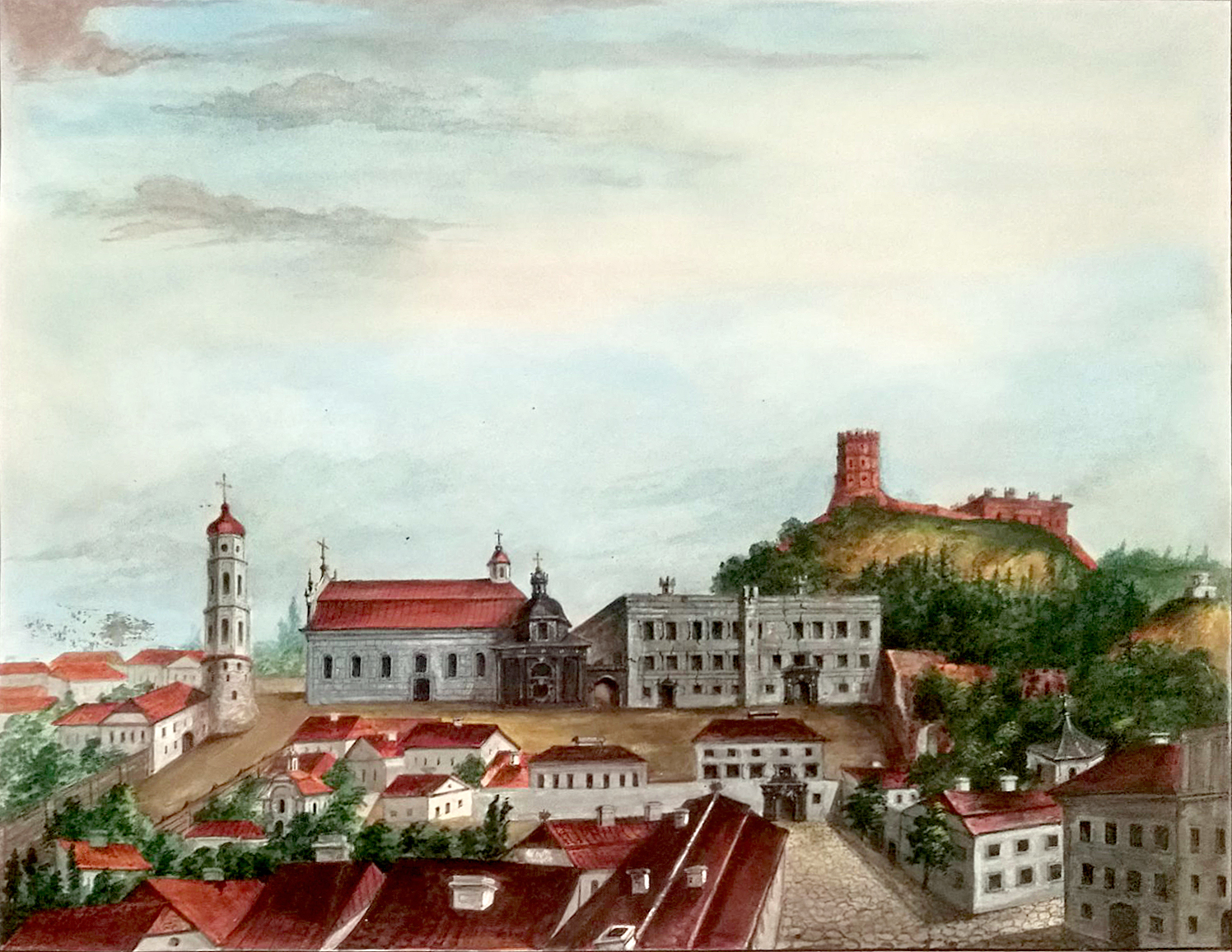
Vilnius Cathedral and Palace of the Grand Dukes of Lithuania (center) in 1796, before 19th century demolition of the palace and reconstruction of the cathedral

Giovanni Cini (1495 in Settignano, Tuscany – 1565 in Vilnius, Lithuania or Kraków, Poland) was an Italian sculptor, architect. He worked as sculptor in the Wawel Castle in Kraków and participated in designing and decorating Vilnius Cathedral, Palace of the Grand Dukes of Lithuania in Vilnius.

== Biography ==
Cini was born in 1495 in Settignano, Tuscany. In 1519–1534 (with breaks) he lived in the Crown of the Kingdom of Poland and worked as sculptor in the Wawel Castle. In 1532–1534 he with others rebuilt the Płock Cathedral.

Since 1535 Cini began visiting Vilnius, Grand Duchy of Lithuania and in 1545 he moved there permanently. In 1539, he led the reconstruction works of the Vilnius Cathedral, which was damaged by fire. Moreover, together with another Italian architect Bernardinus Zanobi da Gianotti, since 1539 he participated and following the death of Gianotti in 1541 led the reconstruction and enlargement of the Palace of the Grand Dukes of Lithuania in Vilnius.

Cini died in 1565 in Vilnius, Lithuania or Kraków, Poland.
