= Jacopo Tencalla =

Italian sculptor and stonemason (1593-1646)

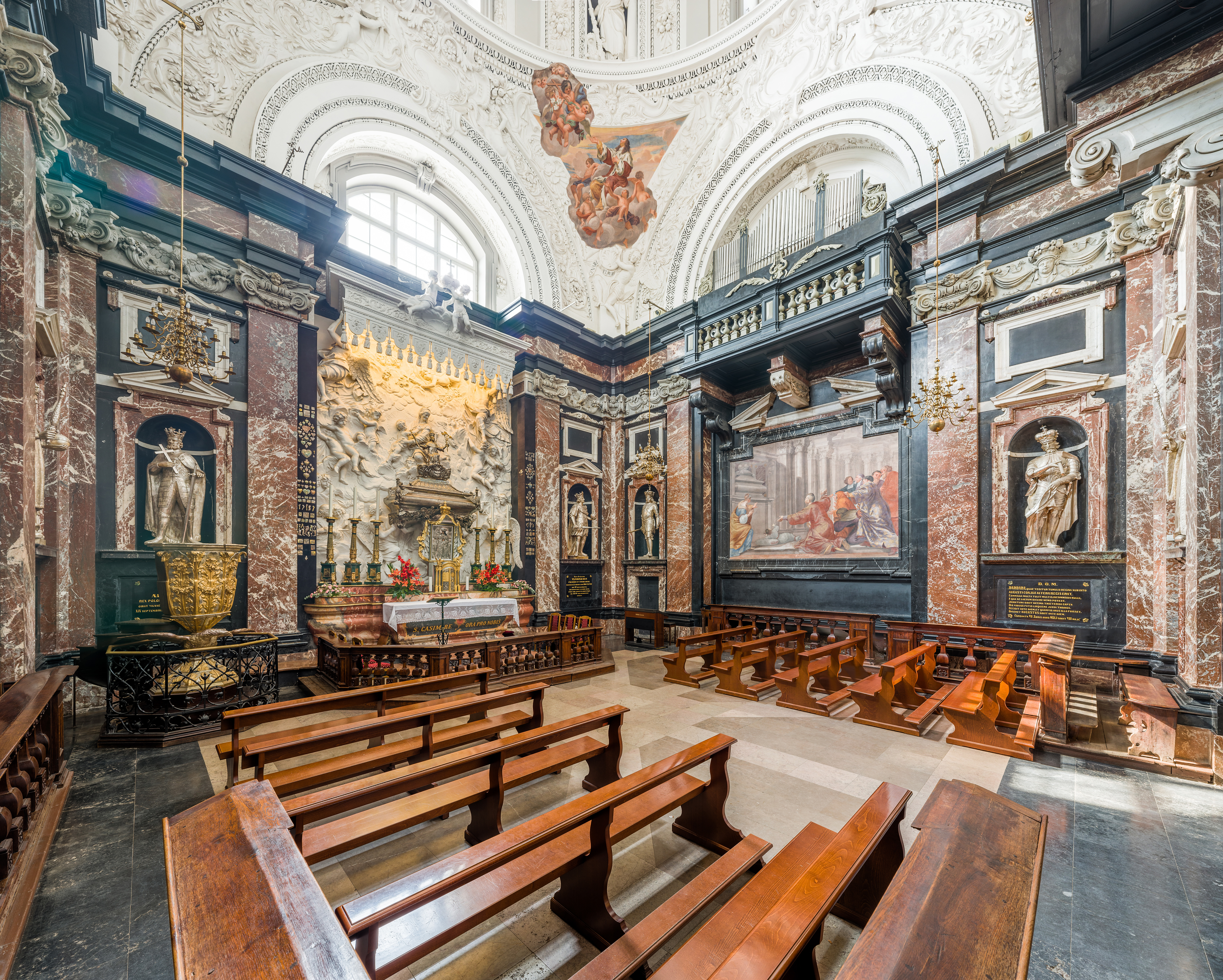
Chapel of Saint Casimir in Vilnius, Lithuania

Jacopo Tencalla (end of the 16th century–beginning of the 17th century – after 1643) was a Swiss-Italian sculptor and stonemason, hailing from the present-day Canton of Ticino, who after working in Rome arrived to Vilnius, the capital city of the Grand Duchy of Lithuania, with his brother Costante Tencalla and participated in decorating the Chapel of Saint Casimir of the Vilnius Cathedral and the Palace of the Grand Dukes of Lithuania, which served as the residence of the Lithuanian monarchs, and created the epitaph of Stanisław Kiszka, Bishop of Samogitia (1618–1626). He was a relative, student, and colleague of Carlo Maderno, who is remembered as one of the fathers of Baroque architecture.
