= Matteo Castelli =

Swiss sculptor & architect (c.1555–1632)

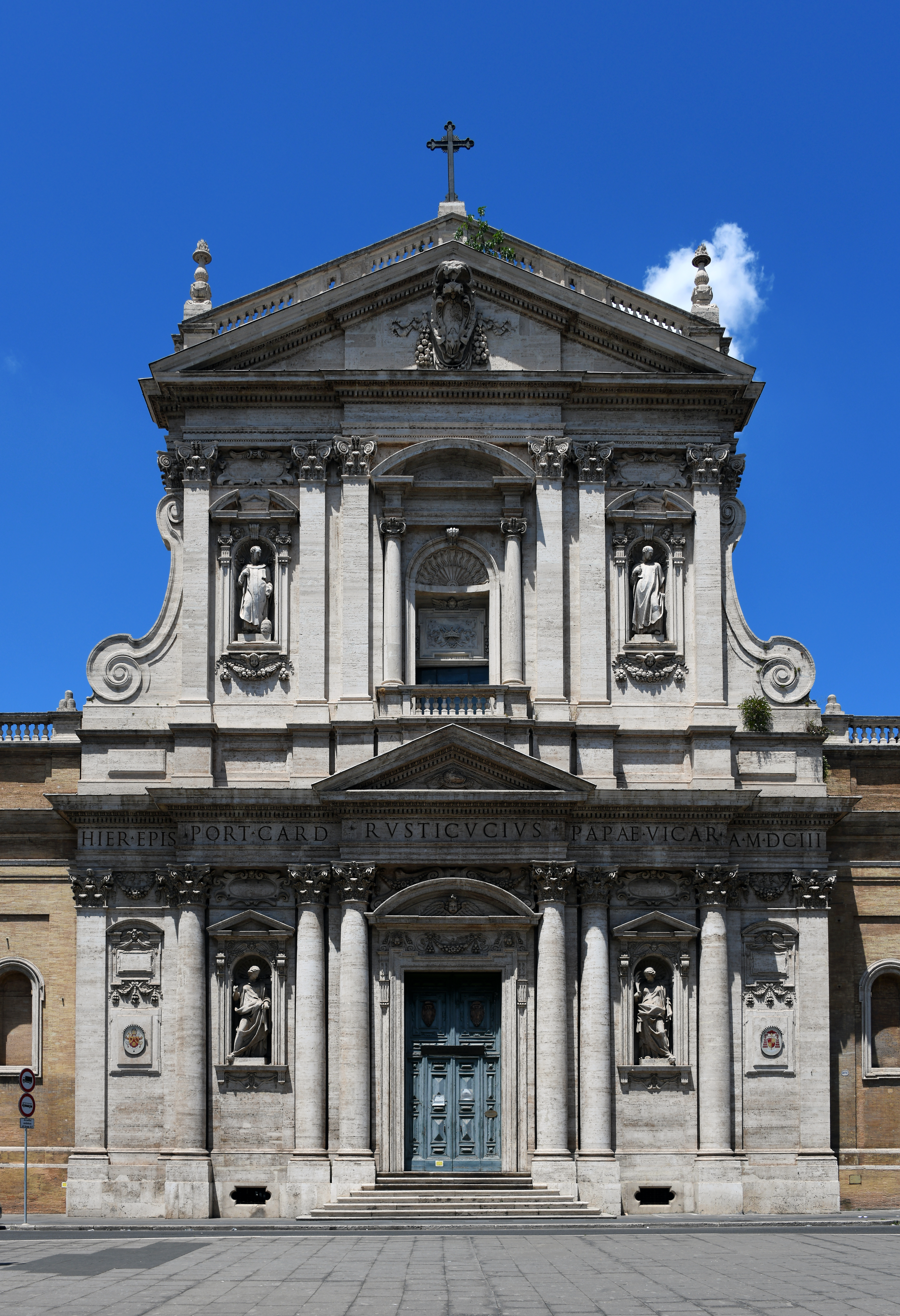
Facade of Santa Susanna in Rome.

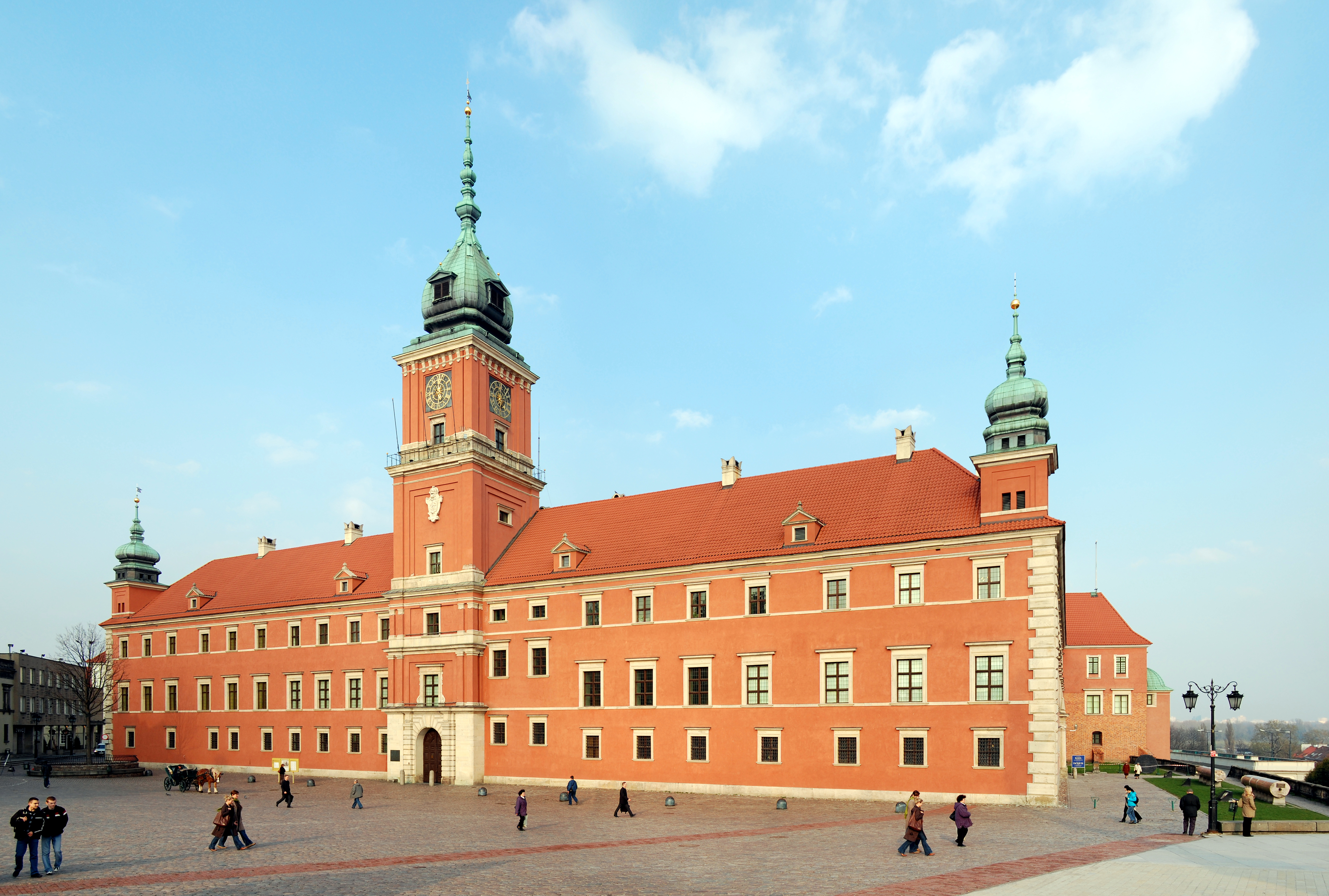
Royal Castle in Warsaw.

Matteo Castelli (c. 1555, Melide, Switzerland - 1632, Warsaw) was a Swiss architect. His nephew Costante Tencalla also became an architect. Further can be attributed to Castelli: in Kraków the church of St. Peter and Paul (1613–1619, the only church north of the Alps in the Roman Baroque style), the Zbaraski princely chapel in the Dominican church (1627-1629) and the altar of St. Stanislaus in the cathedral, also in Vilnius cathedral the chapel of St. Casimir (1626–1636), the Ujazdowski palace and the royal residence near Warsaw. In Melide he donated a memorial chapel in 1625-1626 and rebuilt the altar of his family in the parish church.

== Selected works ==
=== Rome ===
- facade of Santa Susanna (in collaboration with Francesco Rossi, to plans by Carlo Maderno), 1597-1603
- Cappella Barberini at Sant'Andrea della Valle
- Sant'Andrea della Valle (collaboration with Carlo Maderno)
- Palazzo Mattei (collaboration with Carlo Maderno)

=== Florence ===
- Cappella Rucellai

=== Poland and Lithuania ===
- Royal Castle of Warsaw (rebuilding)
- Ujazdów Castle in Warsaw (collaboration with Giovanni Trevano) in 1624
- Chapel of Saint Casimir in Vilnius

== Bibliography ==
- (in Italian) Giovanni Baglione, Le Vite de' Pittori, Scultori et Architetti dal Pontificato di Gregorio XIII fino a tutto quello d'Urbano VIII, Roma 1642.
- (in Italian) Giuseppe Bianchi, Gli Artisti Ticinesi. Dizionario biografico, Libreria Bianchi, Lugano 1900, 47–48.
- (in Italian) Piero Bianconi, Cappelle del Ticino, Pedrazzini Edizioni, Locarno 1971, (13), (14).
- (in German) Jacob Hess, Studien zu Renaissance und Barock, Volume 1, 354–356.
- (in Italian) Mariusz Karpowicz, Artisti Ticinesi In Polonia nel '600, Arti grafiche Bernasconi S.A., Lugano-Agno 1983, 29, 46, 54, 55, 56, 57, 58, 59, 74, 94, 98, 105; Idem, Matteo Castello, architekt wczesnego baroku, Wydawn. Neriton, Varsavia 1994; Idem, Matteo Castello. L'architetto del primo barocco a Roma e in Polonia, Lugano 2003; Idem, Matteo Castello da Melide. L'architetto del primo barocco da Roma alla Polonia, in Giorgio Mollisi (a cura di), Arte&Storia, Svizzeri a Roma nella storia, nell'arte, nella cultura, nell'economia dal Cinquecento ad oggi, Edizioni Ticino Management, anno 8, numero 35, settembre-ottobre 2007, Lugano 2007, 124-129 (con bibliografia aggiornata).
- (in Italian) Rūstis Kamuntavičius et alii: Artisti del lago di Lugano e del Mendrisiotto in Lituania, in Gli artisti del lago di Lugano e del Mendrisiotto nel Granducato di Lituania (dal XVI al XVIII sec.), Hrsg Giorgio Mollisi, «Arte&Storia», Edizioni Ticino Management, anno 13, numero 59, agosto-ottobre 2013, Lugano 2013.
- (in Italian) Works of Matteo Castelli
- Rome Guide
