= Costante Tencalla =

Swiss-Italian architect and sculptor (1593-1646)

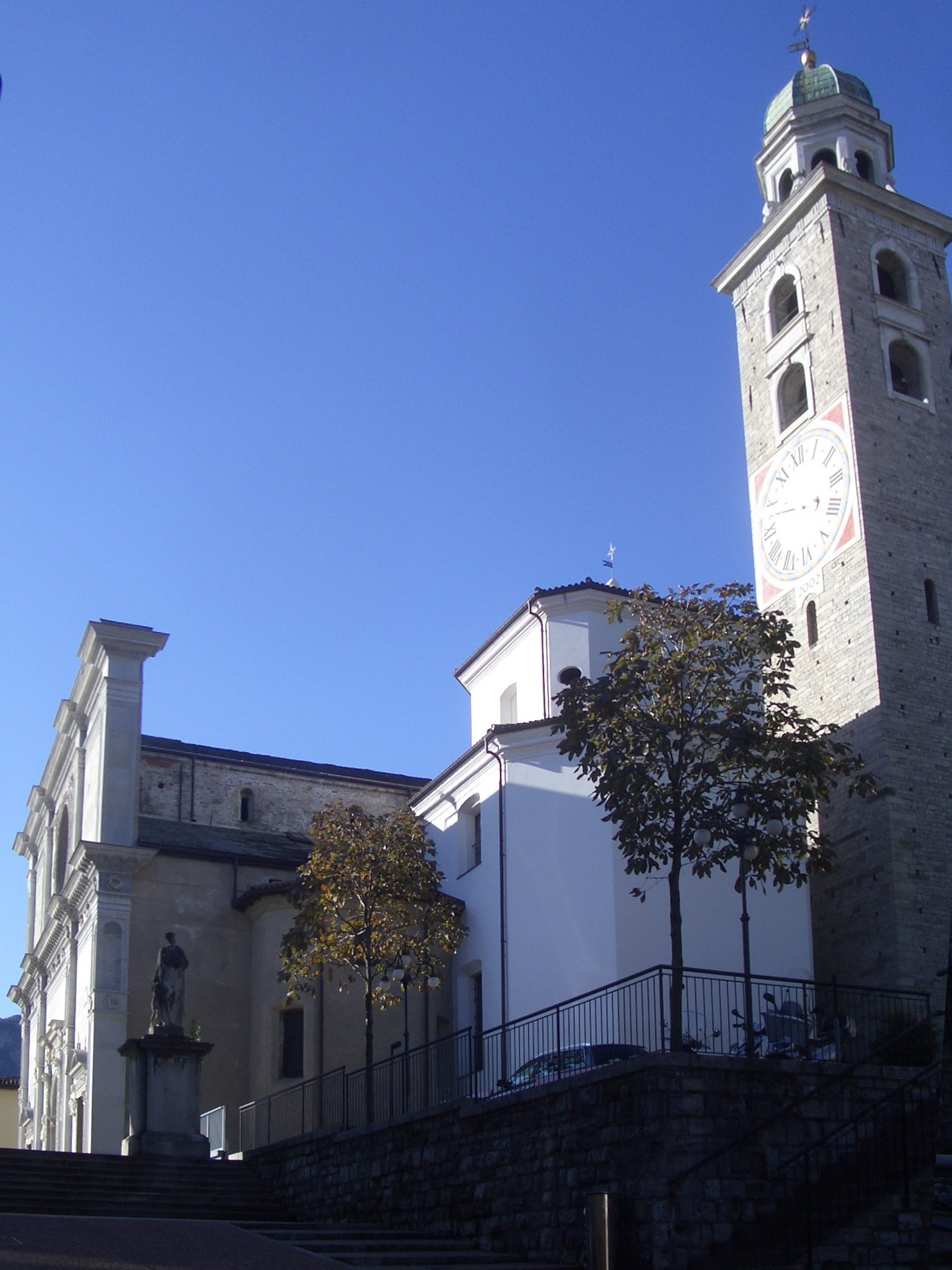
Side view of Lugano Cathedral

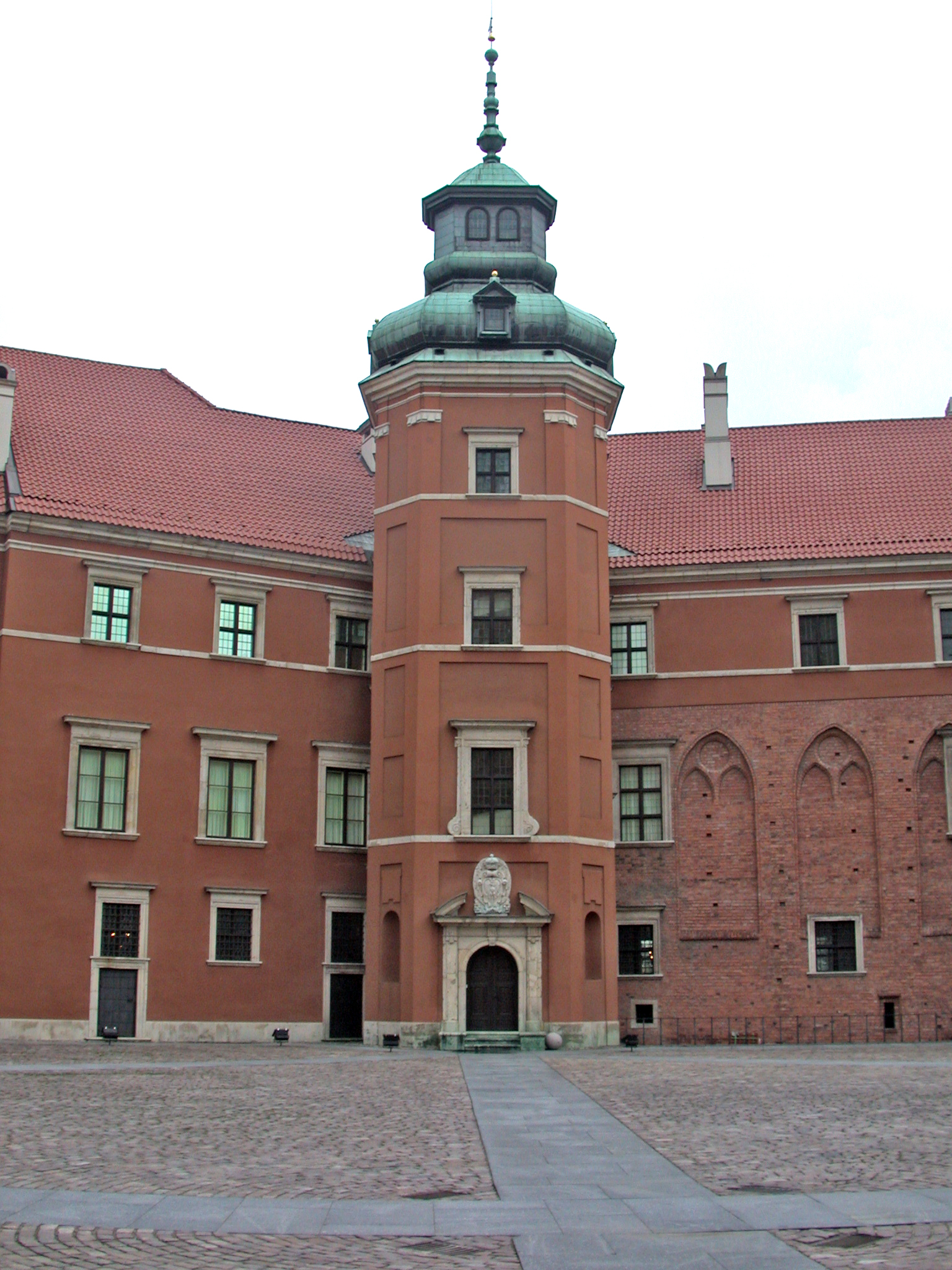
Władysław's Tower in the Royal Castle of Warsaw, rebuilt by Tencalla between 1637 and 1643

Costante Tencalla (1593, Bissone - 1646, Warsaw) was a Swiss-Italian architect and sculptor. He was a nephew of Matteo Castelli, brother of Jacopo Tencalla and also a relative, student, and colleague of Carlo Maderno, who is remembered as one of the fathers of Baroque architecture.

== Life ==
He trained in Rome and spent his early working life there before going to Poland with his uncle Matteo Castelli, who became Poland's first royal architect. On Castelli's death he moved back to Italy to work on buildings in Bissone and Lugano. He then returned to Warsaw as architect to Władysław IV Vasa, who commissioned important buildings from him in Warsaw, Kraków, Leopoli, Gniezno, and Vilnius (Grand Duchy of Lithuania).
