= Church of Sts. Peter and Paul, Vilnius =

Roman Catholic church in Vilnius, Lithuania

Church of Sts. Peter and Paul
- Šv. apaštalų Petro ir Povilo bažnyčia
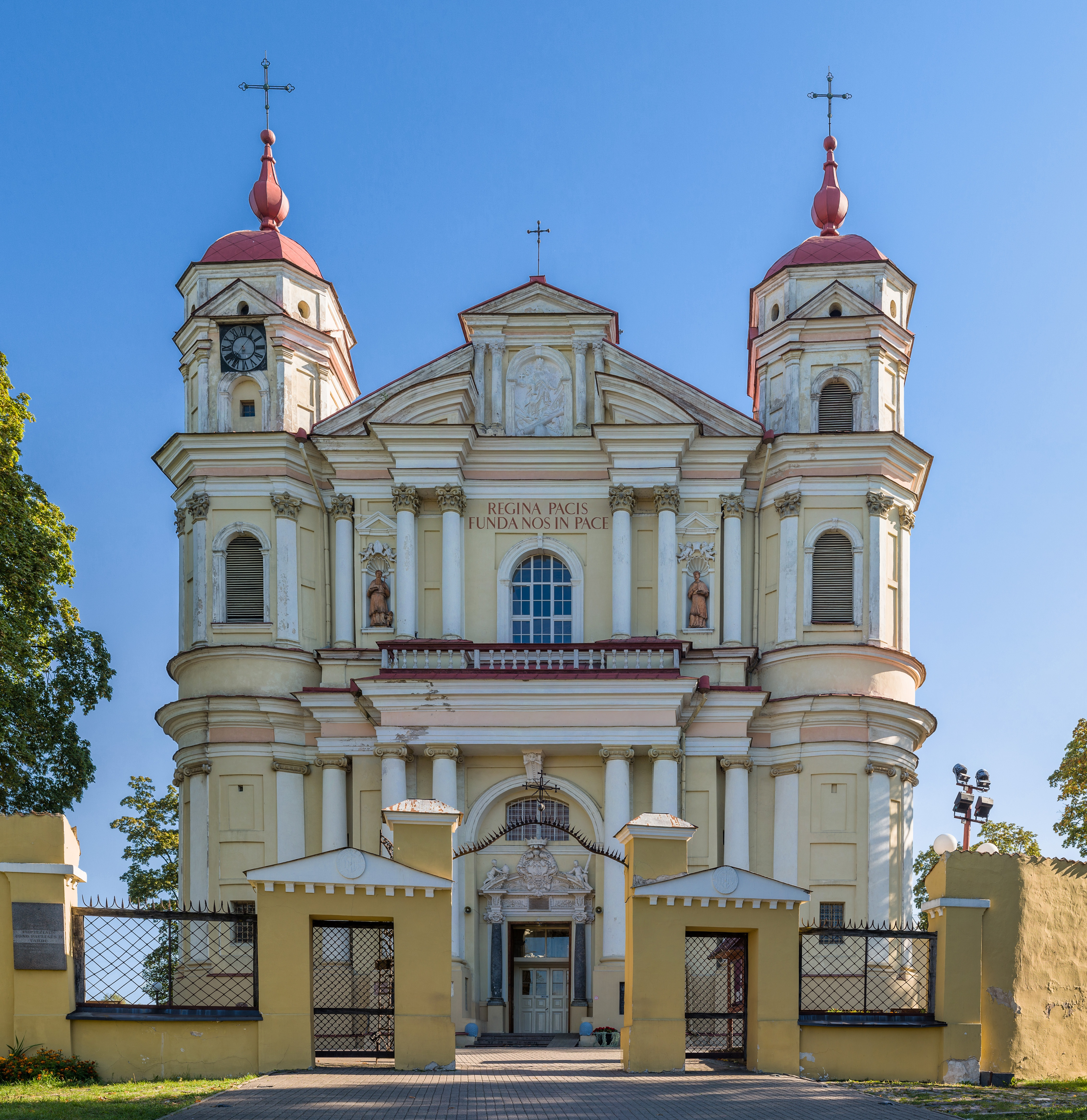
- Front view of the church

Religion
- Affiliation: Roman Catholic
- Diocese: Antakalnis
- Patron: Saint Peter; Saint Paul
- Year consecrated: 1701
- Status: Active

Location
- Location: Vilnius, Lithuania
- Interactive map of Church of Sts. Peter and Paul
- Coordinates: 54°41′39″N 25°18′23″E

Architecture
- Architect: Jan Zaor
- Style: Baroque
- Funded by: Michał Kazimierz Pac
- Groundbreaking: 1668
- Completed: 1701

Specifications
- Direction of façade: Southwest
- Capacity: 980
- Height (max): 16.4 metres (54 ft)
- Dome: One
- Dome height (inner): 39 metres (128 ft)
- Spire: Two
- Spire height: 24 metres (79 ft)
- Materials: Clay bricks
- Cultural Monuments of Lithuania
- Type: National
- Designated: 13 February 2008
- Reference no.: 27300

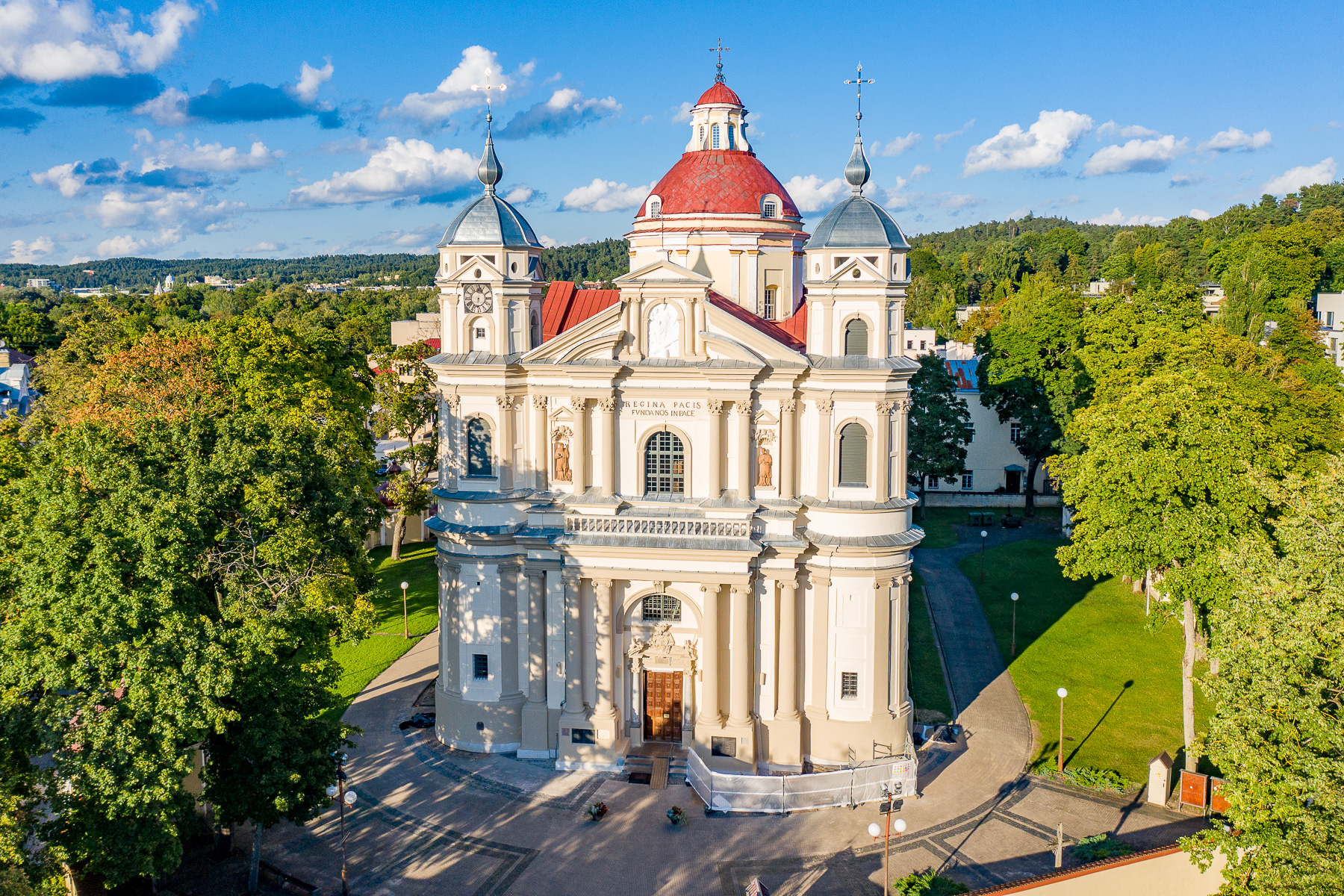
Aerial view

The Church of Sts. Peter and Paul (Lithuanian: Šv. apaštalų Petro ir Povilo bažnyčia; Polish: Kościół św. Piotra i Pawła na Antokolu) is a Roman Catholic church located in the Antakalnis neighbourhood of Vilnius, Lithuania, designed and built by Jan Zaor of Kraków. It is the centerpiece of a former monastery complex of the Canons Regular of the Lateran. Its interior has masterful compositions of some 2,000 stucco figures by Giovanni Pietro Perti and ornamentation by Giovanni Maria Galli and is unique in Europe. The church is considered a masterpiece of the Polish–Lithuanian Commonwealth Baroque. It was funded by Michał Kazimierz Pac, commemorating a victory over the Muscovites and their expulsion from Vilnius after six years of occupation.

== History ==
The foundation of the first church in this location is unknown, although, while digging the foundations for the present-day church, workers found a sculpture of an unknown knight. That inspired a legend that the first wooden church was founded by Petras Goštautas, a legendary ancestor of the Goštautai family, well before the official conversion of Lithuania to Christianity by Jogaila in 1387. More likely, the church was founded by Wojciech Tabor, Bishop of Vilnius (1492–1507). The wooden church burned down in 1594 but was rebuilt in 1609–16. In 1625, Bishop Eustachy Wołłowicz invited Canons Regular of the Lateran. Their new monastery was officially opened in November 1638. Bishop of Samogitia Jerzy Tyszkiewicz gifted a painting of Blessed Virgin Mary of Mercy (Lithuanian: Švč. Mergelė Marija Maloningoji) to the church and the monastery. The painting was brought by Tyszkiewicz from Faenza, Italy around 1641–47, and depicts Our Lady of Graces, patron of Faenza. Even though it was not canonically crowned, it was covered in silver riza and attracted votive offerings.

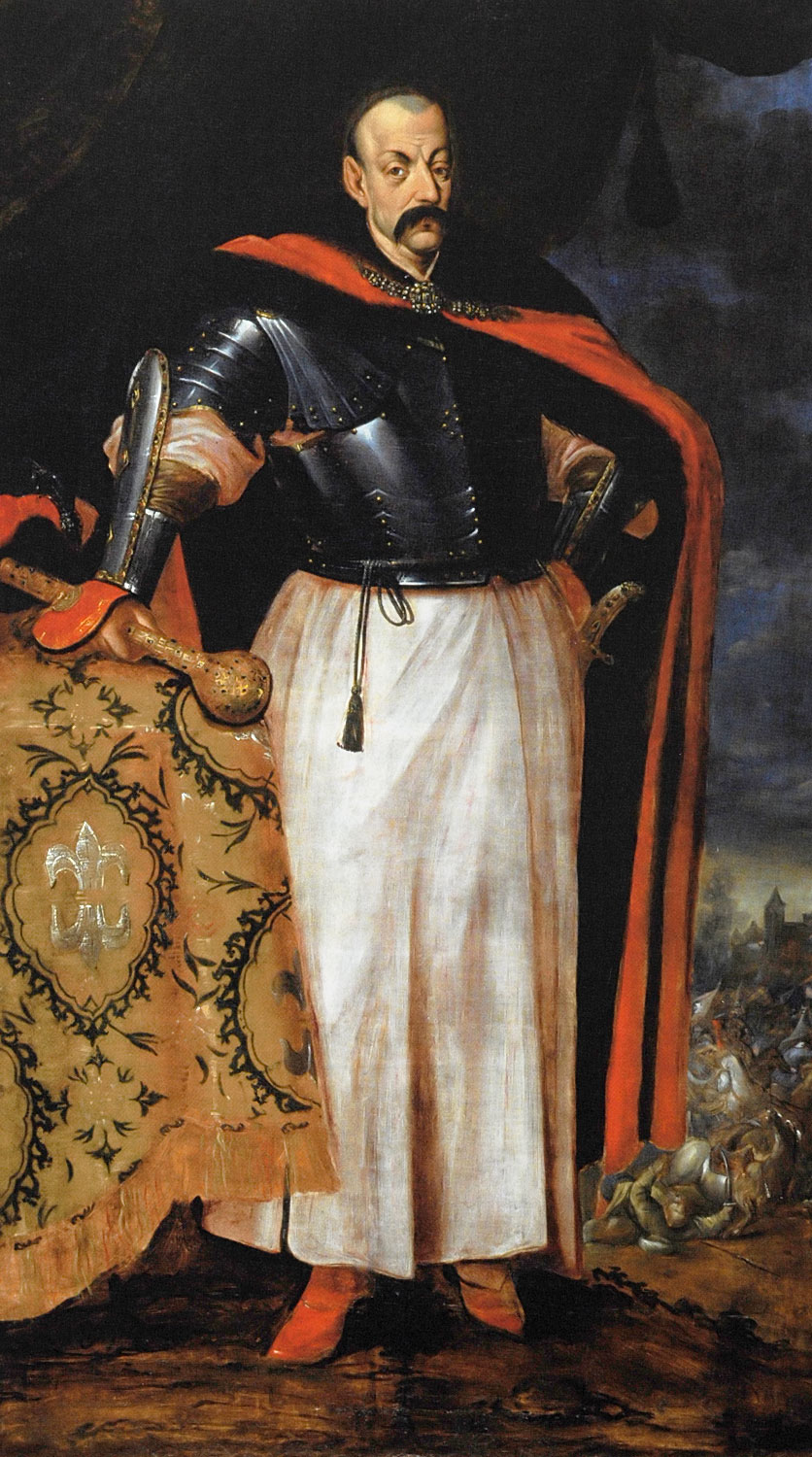
This painting of the church's founder, Michał Kazimierz Pac, hangs in the apse.

During the wars with Russia in 1655–61, the monastery was burned down and the church was destroyed. The construction of the new church was commissioned by the Great Lithuanian Hetman and Voivode of Vilnius Michał Kazimierz Pac. It is said that Pac was inspired to rebuild the church after a 1662 incident when he hid in its ruins and thus narrowly escaped death from mutinous soldiers who later killed Wincenty Korwin Gosiewski, Field Hetman of Lithuania, and Kazimierz Żeromski. Before this project, Pac, having made only a couple relatively minor donations to Bernardines in Vilnius and Jesuits in Druskininkai, was not known as a patron of the church or the arts. Pac, who never married, envisioned that the church would become a mausoleum for the Pac family. The construction works started on 29 June 1668 (the day of the Feast of Saints Peter and Paul) under the supervision and according to design of Jan Zaor from Kraków and finished in 1676 by Giovanni Battista Frediani. Pac brought Italian masters Giovanni Pietro Perti and Giovanni Maria Galli for interior decoration. Perti and Galli abundantly decorated the interior of the church with white stucco moldings, some of which were innovative artworks even by at the time Italian standards. The works were interrupted by the founder's death in 1682. According to his last wishes, Pac was buried beneath the doorstep of the main entrance with the Latin inscription Hic Jacet Pecator (here lies a sinner) on his tombstone. At the end of the 18th century, lightning hit the church, knocked down a sculpture which fell and fractured the tombstone; the incident inspired many rumors about Pac and his sins. The tombstone is now displayed on the right wall of the main entrance.

The church was finished by Pac's brother, Bishop of Samogitia Kazimierz Pac, and was consecrated in 1701, while the final decoration works were completed only in 1704. The construction of the church revitalized Antakalnis and attracted other nobles: Sapiehas who built Sapieha Palace and Słuszkos who built Slushko Palace. The interior of the church changed relatively little since that time. The major change was the loss of the main altar. The wooden altar was moved to the Catholic church in Daugai in 1766. The altar is now dominated by the Farewell of St. Peter and St. Paul, a large painting by Franciszek Smuglewicz, installed there in 1805. The interior was restored by Giovanni Beretti and Nicolae Piano from Milan in 1801–04. At the same time, a new pulpit imitating the ship of Saint Peter was installed. In 1864, as reprisal for the failed January Uprising, Mikhail Muravyov-Vilensky closed the monastery and converted its buildings into military barracks. There were plans to turn the church into an Eastern Orthodox church, but they never materialized. In 1901–05, the interior was restored again. The church acquired the boat-shaped chandelier and the new pipe organ with two manuals and 23 organ stops. The dome was damaged during World War II bombings, but was rebuilt true to its original design. When in 1956 Vilnius Cathedral was converted into an art museum by Soviet authorities, the silver sarcophagus with sacred relics of Saint Casimir was moved to the church of Sts. Peter and Paul. The sarcophagus was returned to its place in 1989. Despite religious persecutions in the Soviet Union, extensive interior restoration was carried out in 1976–87.

== Architecture ==
=== Exterior ===
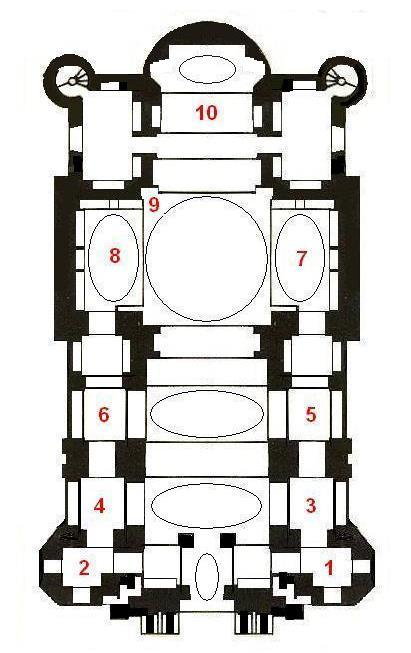
Floor plan: 1. Right round room (small chapel) 2. Left round room (former baptistery) 3. Knights' chapel 4. Queens' chapel 5. St. Ursula chapel 6. St. Augustine chapel 7. Altar of the Five Holy Wounds 8. Altar of Mary the Mother of Mercy 9. Jesus of Antakalnis 10. The main altar

The church is located on a small hill near the Neris River and the former main road to Nemenčinė. It is part of a monastery complex that occupies approximately 1.5 hectares (3.7 acres). The churchyard is surrounded by a thick 4–5 m (13–16 ft) high brick wall that has four small octagonal chapels. The churchyard used to have a small cemetery, but it was demolished in the 19th century. The church is a 17th-century basilica with a traditional cross floor plan and a dome with a lantern allowing extra light into its white interior. However, the dome is lowered and is visible only from a distance. The exterior was copied from the parish church of Tarłów, built in 1645–55 and most likely designed by the same architect Jan Zaor. The facade is of heavy proportions. It is divided by a prominent balcony, freestanding columns (used for the first time in Lithuanian ecclesiastical architecture), windows, and cornices. The central facade is framed by two bell towers that are circular at the bottom and octagonal at the top. Two brass bells, 60 and 37 cm (24 and 15 in) in height, survive from 1668.

The double broken pediment has a relief of Mary standing on a cannon, flags, and other military attributes. Below the relief, Latin inscription reads REGINA PACIS FUNDA NOS IN PACE (Queen of Peace, protect us in peace) and reflects the intentions of the founder Pac and is a word play on his last name. Further below is the main portal. Surrounded by two puttos holding papal tiara (symbol of Saint Peter) and a sword (symbol of Saint Paul), there is a large cartouche with Pac's coat of arms Gosdawa. Two terracotta sculptures depicting Saint Augustine (patron saint of Canons Regular of the Lateran) and Stanisław Kazimierczyk (Polish member of Canons Regular) were created in 1674. They measure 2.05 metres (6 ft 9 in) in height. There were many more sculptures on the front and back of the church, but they did not survive. The facade was also decorated with a 172 cm × 237 cm (68 in × 93 in) painting depicting Virgin of Mercy protecting people from the plague of 1710 in Vilnius. Imagery of Mary holding broken arrows of god's wrath was borrowed from the painting of Blessed Virgin Mary of Mercy that hangs inside the church. Created in 1761, it was restored at least five times and lost its original features. After the last restoration in 2000, it was moved inside the church.

=== Interior ===
==== Decor and central nave ====
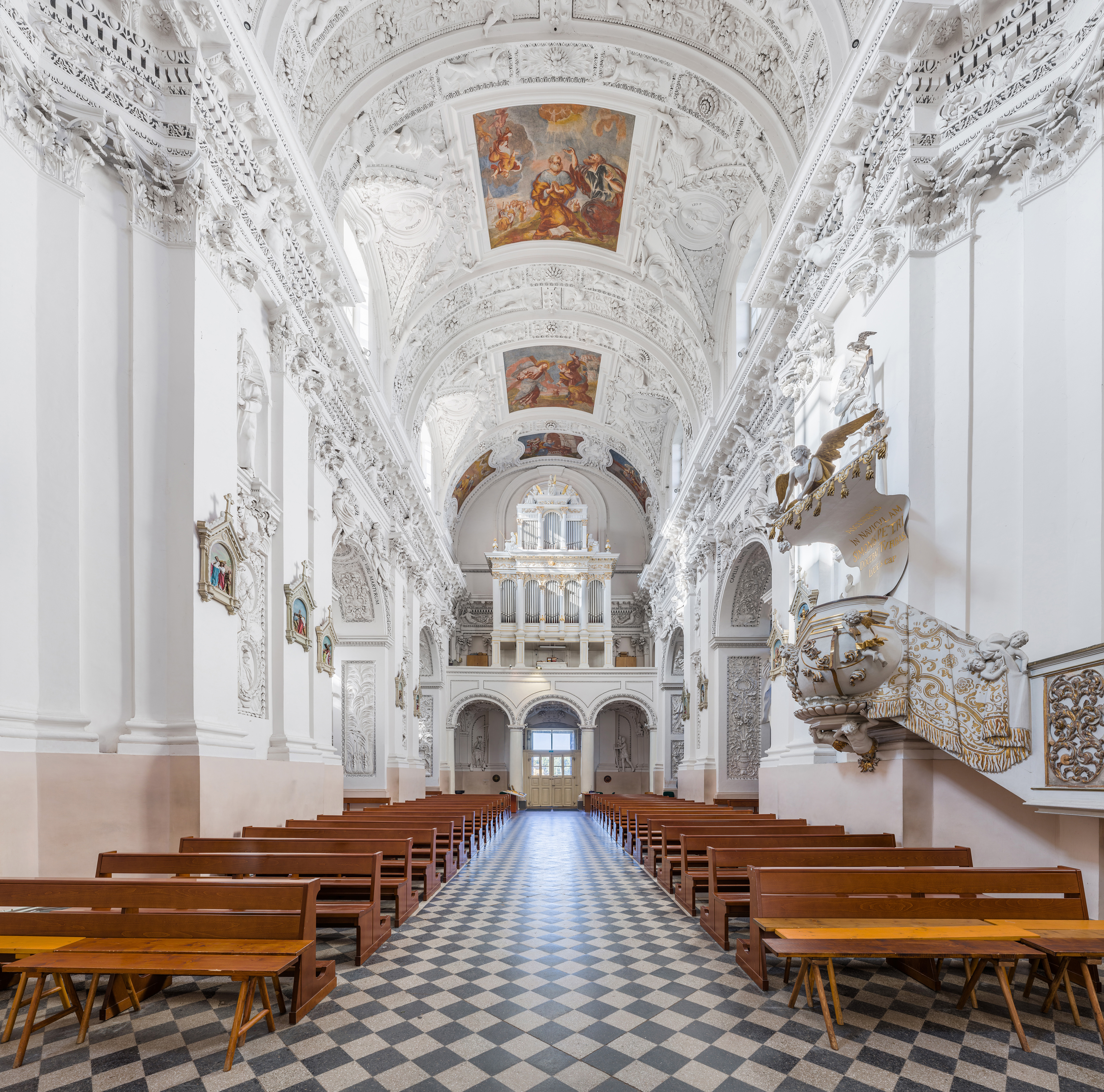
Central nave looking south-west towards the entrance

Sts. Peter and Paul church is one of the most studied churches in Lithuania. Its interior has over 2,000 different decor elements that creates a stunning atmosphere. The main author of the decor plan is not known. It could be the founder Pac, monks of the Lateran, or Italian artists. No documents survive to explain the ideas behind the decorations, therefore various art historians attempted to find one central theme: Pac's life and Polish–Lithuanian relations, teachings of Saint Augustine, Baroque theater, etc. Art historian Birutė Rūta Vitkauskienė identified several main themes of the decor: structure of the Church as proclaimed at the Council of Trent with Saint Peter as the founding rock, early Christian martyrs representing Pac's interest in knighthood and ladyship, themes relevant to the Canons Regular of the Lateran, and themes inherited from previous churches (painting of Blessed Virgin Mary of Mercy and altar of Five Wounds of Christ). The decor combines a great variety of symbols, from local (patron of Vilnius Saint Christopher) to Italian saints (Fidelis of Como), from specific saints to allegories of virtues. There are many decorative elements – floral (acanthus, sunflowers, rues, fruits), various objects (military weapons, household tools, liturgical implements, shells, ribbons), figures (puttos, angels, soldiers), fantastical creatures (demons, dragons, centaurs), Pac's coat of arms, masks making various expressions – but they are individualized, rarely repeating. The architects and sculptors borrowed ideas from other churches in Poland (Saints Peter and Paul Church, Kraków, Sigismund's Chapel of Wawel Cathedral) and Italy (St. Peter's Basilica, Church of the Gesù).

The main entrance is flanked by two large sculptures of Saint Christopher carrying baby Jesus and a skeleton (grim reaper with a cloak and a large scythe) standing on crowns and other symbols of power. Saint Christopher is a protector, but death is still awaits everyone equally and Christians should prepare for it. The vestibule also has a scene of Last Judgment with various monsters and demons. The left side of the vestibule has a small room used as baptistery, while the right has a room for wakes. The latter has a scene of Pilate's court that thematically starts the Stations of the Cross. The colorful stations hang in the central nave and lead to the Altar of the Five Wounds of Christ.

The central nave is decorated with evenly spaced sculptures of the twelve apostles. It also has a number of torture scenes from the persecution of Christians in the Roman Empire. These martyrs include Saint Sebastian, knights Saint George and Martin of Tours, Saint Maurice and the Theban Legion, Fidelis of Como and Victor Maurus. However, they are not immediately visible as they are placed in niches. Therefore, the nave is dominated by plain white walls that contrast with the opulent decorations elsewhere. From the central nave, the entrance to each of the four chapels has two allegorical female figures, representing eight Beatitudes from the Sermon on the Mount and created according to the iconography of Cesare Ripa. Their placement above the entrance arch is very similar to the Basilica of Santa Maria del Popolo. However, they are not depicted in order but rearranged so that they would better reflect the themes of the chapels.

==== Chapels and side altars ====
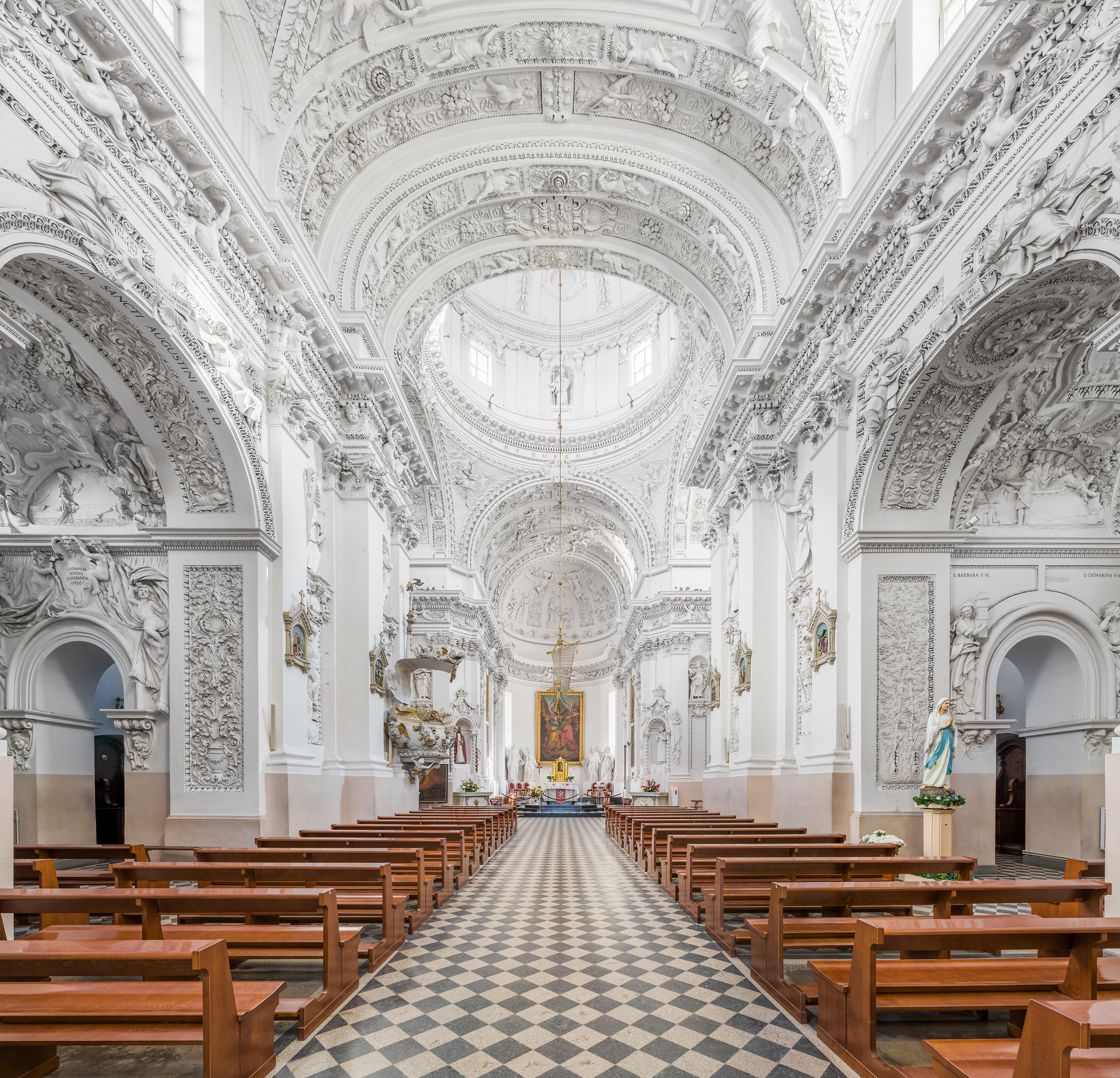
Central nave looking north-east towards the altar

The church has one central nave. Similar to the Church of the Gesù in Rome, the narrow side aisles are turned into interconnecting chapels. There are four chapels: Women's or Queens', Saint Augustine's, Saint Ursula's, and Soldiers' or Knights'. The Queens' chapel was originally dedicated to Saint Petronilla, traditionally identified as daughter of Saint Peter. The chapel has four figures representing women's virtues: piety, generosity, purity, and assiduousness. The figure of generosity presents a stark social contrast between a wealthy lady and a pauper. Some art historians attempted to associate these figures with Queens of Poland: Saint Kinga, Blessed Salomea, Blessed Yolanda, and Saint Hedwig. Painting of Saint Monica, mother of Saint Augustine, hangs in the chapel. The ceiling has scenes of executions and torture of early Christian martyrs, including Saint Fausta and Saint Theodora. The Knights' chapel has four figures of soldiers who became early Christian martyrs, including Saint Martinian, who helped Saint Peter to escape prison, and Saint Florian. The chapel also has a scene of Saint Casimir miraculously helping Lithuanians in the Siege of Polotsk and Saint Wenceslaus fighting with his brother Boleslaus the Cruel. This chapel clearly reflects Pac's interests: he dedicated most of his life to military and thought of himself as a knight. The chapel of Saint Ursula has more figures of early martyrs (Saint Apollonia, Saint Barbara, and Saint Catherine of Alexandria) that emphasize purity. The chapel of Saint Augustine emphasizes his teachings on Holy Trinity as undivided unity.

The transept has altars of two brotherhoods that were active in the church: Merciful Mother of God and Five Wounds of Christ. These brotherhoods existed before the current church was built and, therefore, the imagery is inherited from the previous church. The western (left) transept displays the painting of Blessed Virgin Mary of Mercy and two large Turkish war drums (timpano, 140 cm (55 in) in circumference) that were seized from the Ottomans in the Battle of Khotyn of 11 November 1673 and granted to the church by its founder Michał Kazimierz Pac. The transept ceiling has stucco reliefs from the life of Mary (with Visitation at the center) and crucifixion of Jesus. The Rococo pulpit was installed in 1801–1804. Carved of wood in a shape of a boat, it is supported by two tritons from the bottom. It is decorated with gilded details, including reliefs of eagle, bull, lion, and angel which symbolize the Four Evangelists.

==== Main altar ====
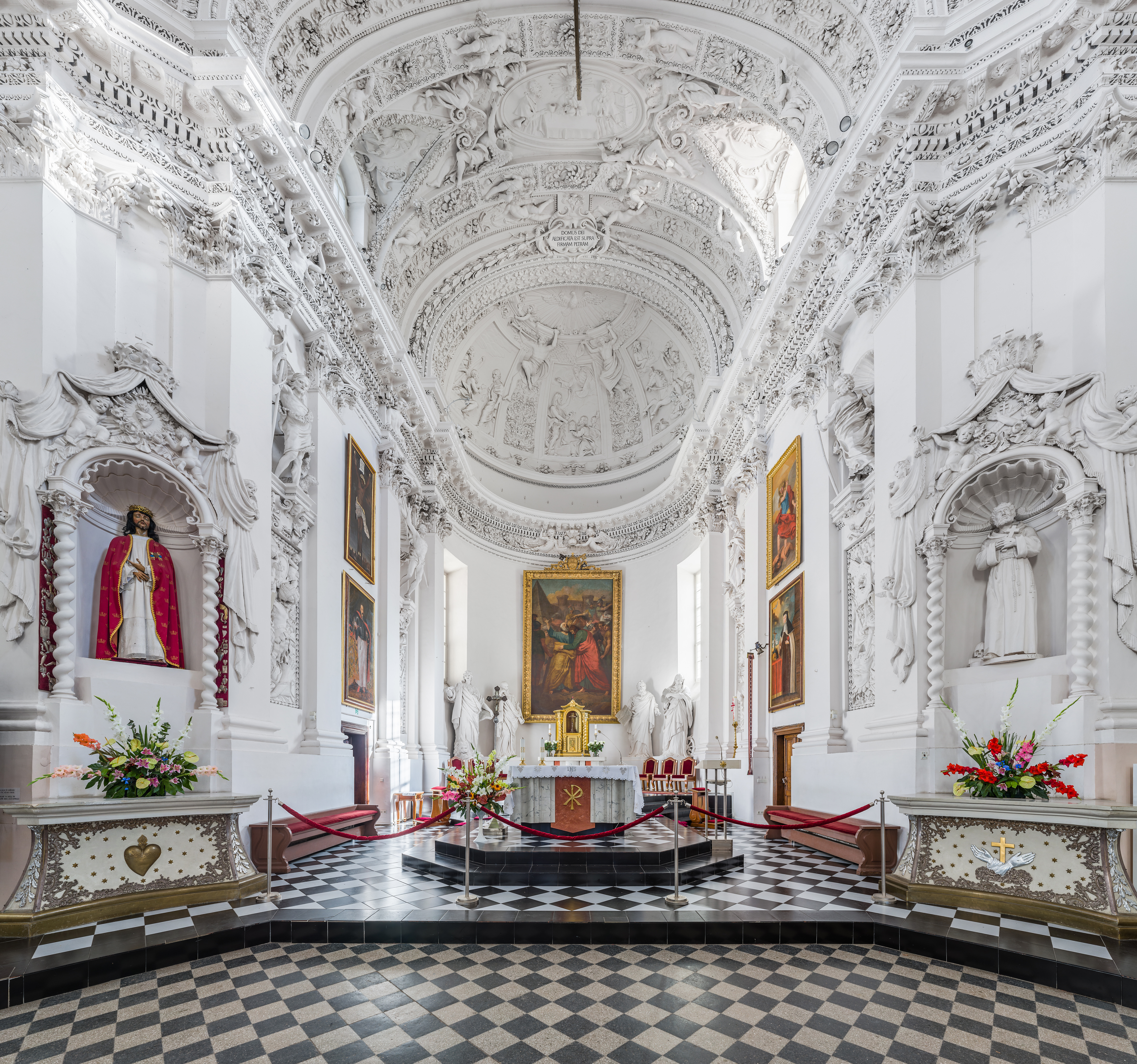
Main altar with Jesus of Antakalnis on the left

A noticeable feature is the missing main altar, which is known only from a description found in the inventory from 1766. It was carved from dark wood, gilded, and served as the focal center of the otherwise white interior. The altar had two levels. The upper level had a miraculous painting of Saint Peter that was most likely brought from the previous church. It was surrounded by sculptures of the twelve apostles representing the twelve tribes of Israel or the chosen people. The lower lever had a painting of Saint Paul surrounded by sculptures depicting twelve pagan nations representing the world or the converted people. This altar was moved to the Catholic church in Daugai in 1766 and only fragments survive to the present day. With the loss of the altar, imagery of Saint Paul diminished significantly within the church. The altar as such was not replaced. Instead, Kazimierz Jelski sculpted four prophets (Daniel, Jeremiah, Isaiah and Elijah) while Franciszek Smuglewicz painted the large central painting depicting the emotional final parting of Saint Peter and Paul.

Four other paintings hang in the choir: another painting by Smuglewicz depicting Archangel Michael, painting of Saint Mary Magdalene of Pazzi, a formal portrait of founder Michał Kazimierz Pac, and a painting of crucified Jesus. This painting depicts a solar eclipse symbolizing crucifixion darkness and is said to be Pac's favorite. Parts of Jesus (crown of thorns, four nails, and perizoma) are covered in metal. The apse has four sculptures that stand inside wall niches, including Saint Jacob, John the Baptist, and resurrected Christ.

The ceiling of the apse is decorated with three stucco reliefs depicting the conversion of Paul the Apostle, calling of Saint Peter, and handing over of the keys of Heaven and papal tiara to Peter by Christ. This scene emphasizes that Peter and subsequent popes derived their power directly from God and is a strong Counter-Reformation statement. Above them, there is a relief of the Holy Spirit represented as a dove. The ceiling of the choir has a relief of the dinner at Emmaus. Next to it, there is a Latin inscription that reads domus dei aedificata est supra firmam petram (your house is built on firm rock) which echoes with the inscription on the base of the dome.

The left corner between the transept and the choir has a sculpture of Jesus known as Jesus of Antakalnis. The sculpture is life-sized (185 cm (73 in)), made of hardwood, dressed in clothes of white silk and purple velvet, and has a wig of natural black hair. A copy of a statue displayed in the Basilica of Jesus de Medinaceli in Madrid, it is the most prominent example of Spanish Baroque in Lithuania. It depicts the scene of Ecce homo: flogged Christ with a crown of thorns facing an angry mob. The sculpture's hands and head were ordered by Jan Kazimierz Sapieha the Younger from Roman artists in 1700. They were attached to a locally made torso and can be rotated. According to an 1804 canonical visitation, there are sacred relics sealed inside the head of the sculpture. The sculpture was displayed in the main altar of the Trinitarian Church built by Sapieha until the church was converted into an Eastern Orthodox church in 1864. At that time it was moved to its present-day location at Sts. Peter and Paul's. The opposite corner has a stucco sculpture of Saint Francis of Assisi made in the first half of the 20th century.

==== Dome and ceilings ====
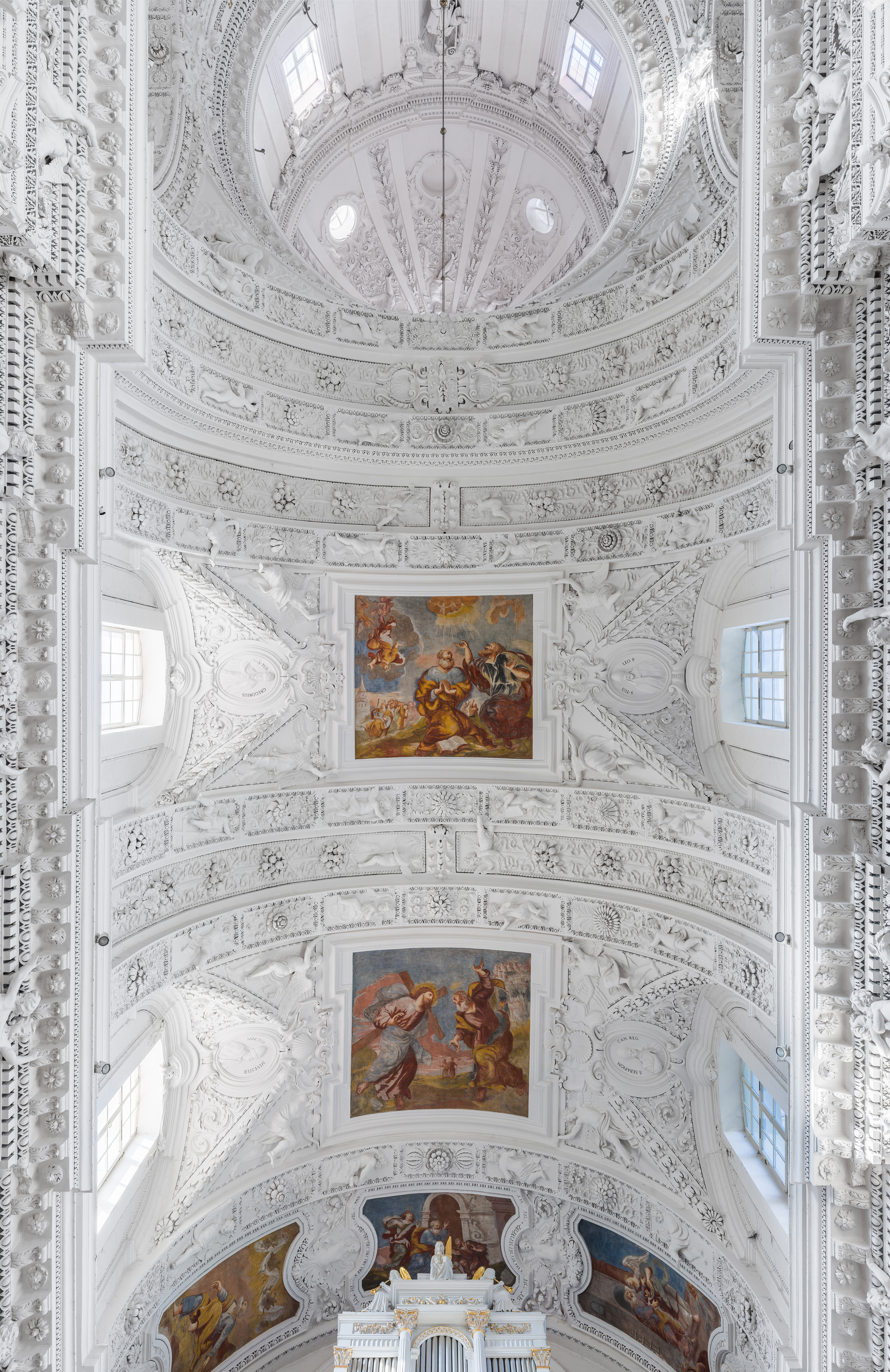
Ceiling

The dome's pendentives depict the Four Evangelists. The inscription surrounding the base of the dome (Tu es Petrus et super hanc petram edificabo ecclesiam meam et portae inferi non-praevale buntadversus eam: You are Peter (rock) and on that rock I shall build my church and gates of hell shall not prevail against it) is from the Confession of Peter and is the same as that of St. Peter's Basilica in the Vatican. Above it, there are sculptures of four Doctors of the Church: Saint Jerome, Saint Augustine (his sculpture can be seen from the entrance), Saint Ambrose, and Pope Gregory I. Still above them there are scores of angels. The composition culminates with God the Father in the center of the dome as if to say that God sees everything. This composition seems inverted since the Evangelists are below the Doctors, but that could be a purposeful statement to emphasize importance of the Church after the Council of Trent. A boat-shaped chandelier made of brass and glass beads hangs from the middle of the dome and reminds that Saint Peter was a fisherman. Made by craftsmen from Liepāja and installed in 1905, it had eight seven-branch candle holders.

The ceiling is decorated with five frescos that cover 14.94 m^{2} (160.8 sq ft) which are the second largest ceiling frescoes (after the Pažaislis Monastery) in Lithuania. The three smaller frescoes above the organ form a triptych from Saint Peter's life: healing a cripple, escape from prison, and vision of a sheet with animals. The other two frescoes depict Quo vadis? and Peter's confrontation with Simon Magus. These frescoes are of a rather simple composition, poorly executed, and lack background detail, but the figures are expressive, making complex, dynamic, almost theatrical movements. The authorship of the frescoes is unknown. Vladas Drėma attributed them to Martino Altomonte, while Mieczysław Skrudlik suggested Michelangelo Palloni. Mindaugas Paknys, using surviving written records, disproved both hypotheses and attributed the frescoes to Johann Gotthard Berchhoff. Two other frescoes by a different author decorate the sacristies. They depict Jesus saving Saint Peter from drowning and a vision of Stanisław Kazimierczyk.

== Gallery ==
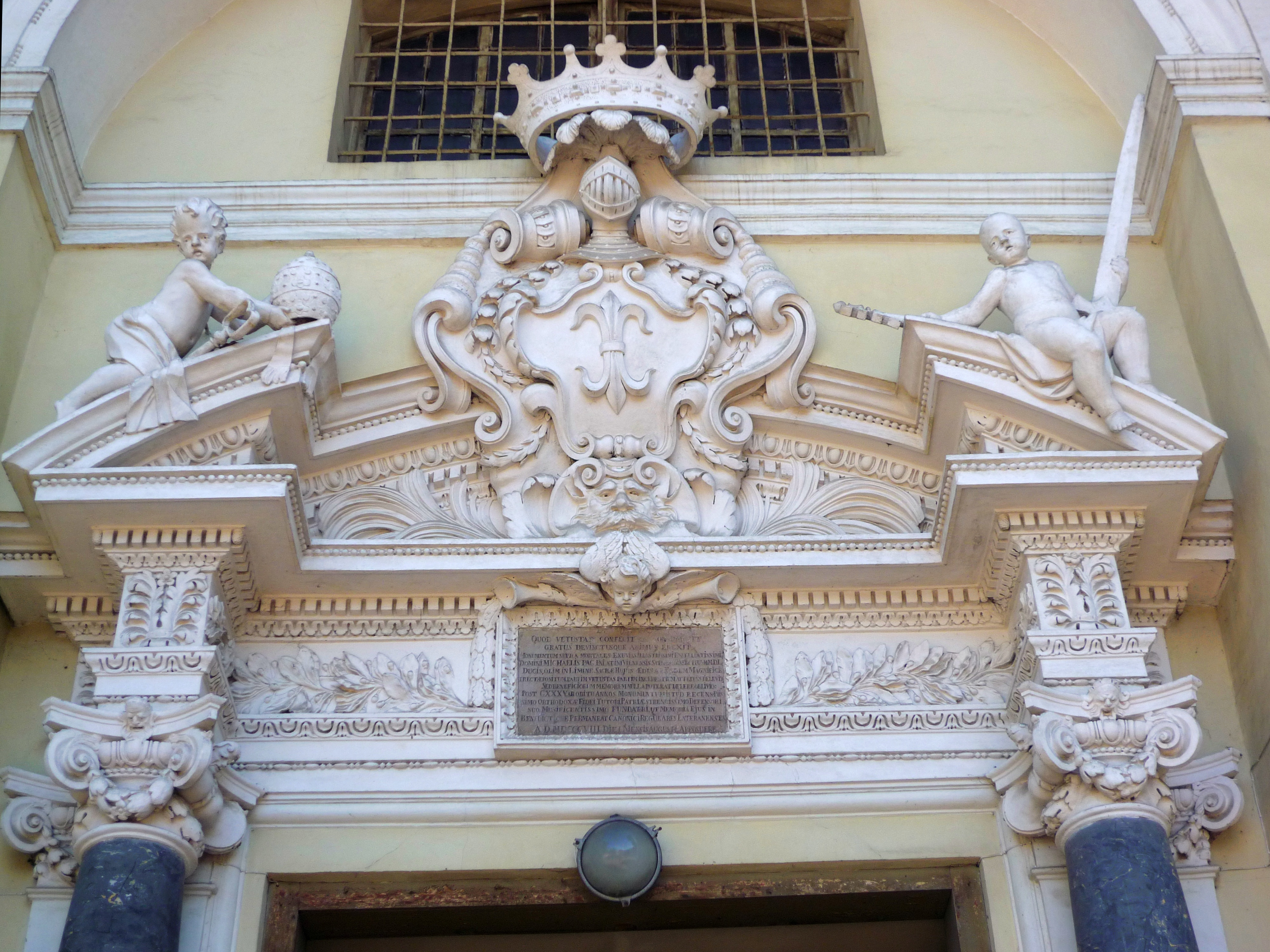
Close up of main portal with Pac's coat of arms in the middle

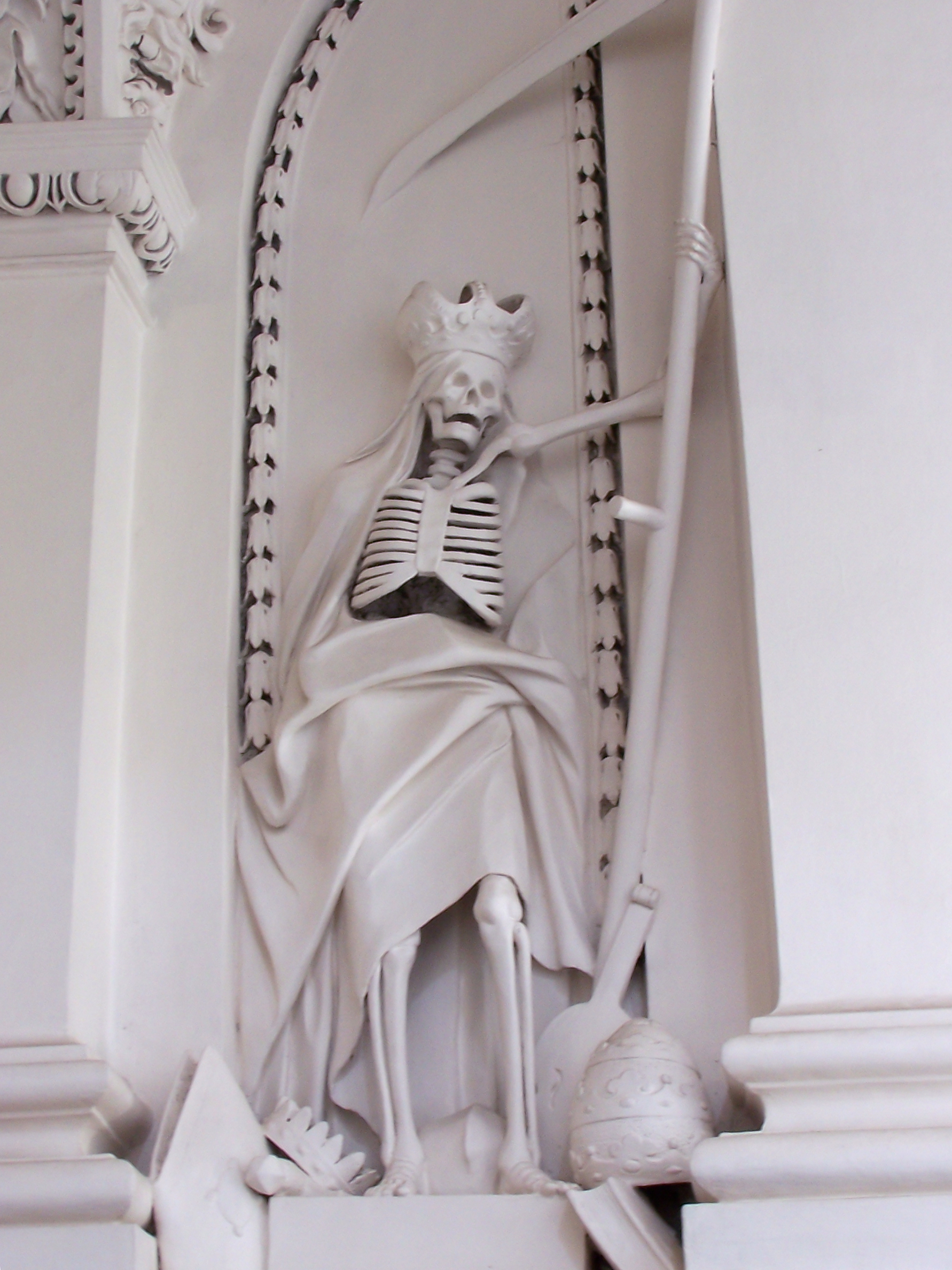
Danse Macabre, a reminder of the universality of death

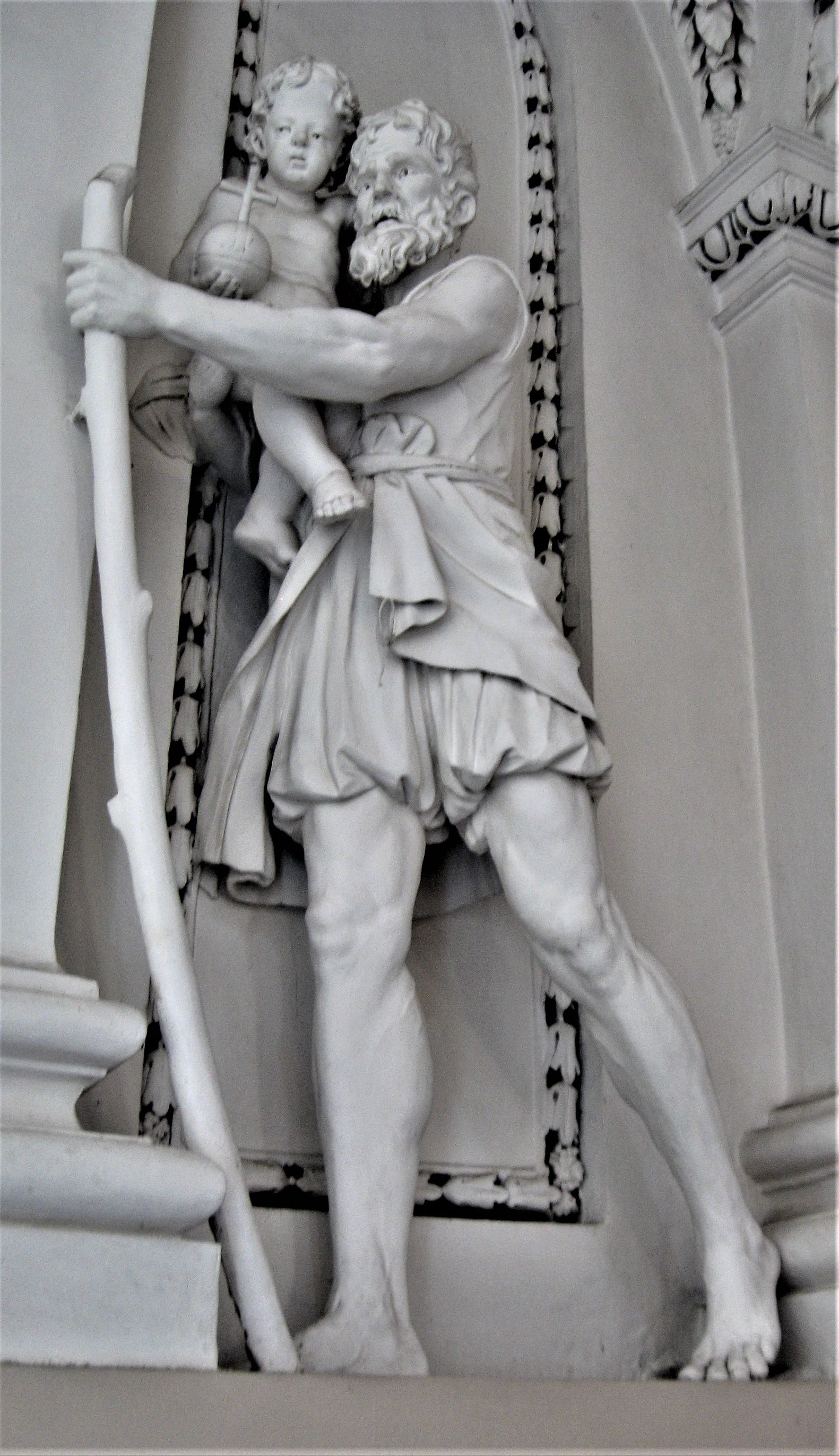
St. Christopher carrying newborn Jesus.

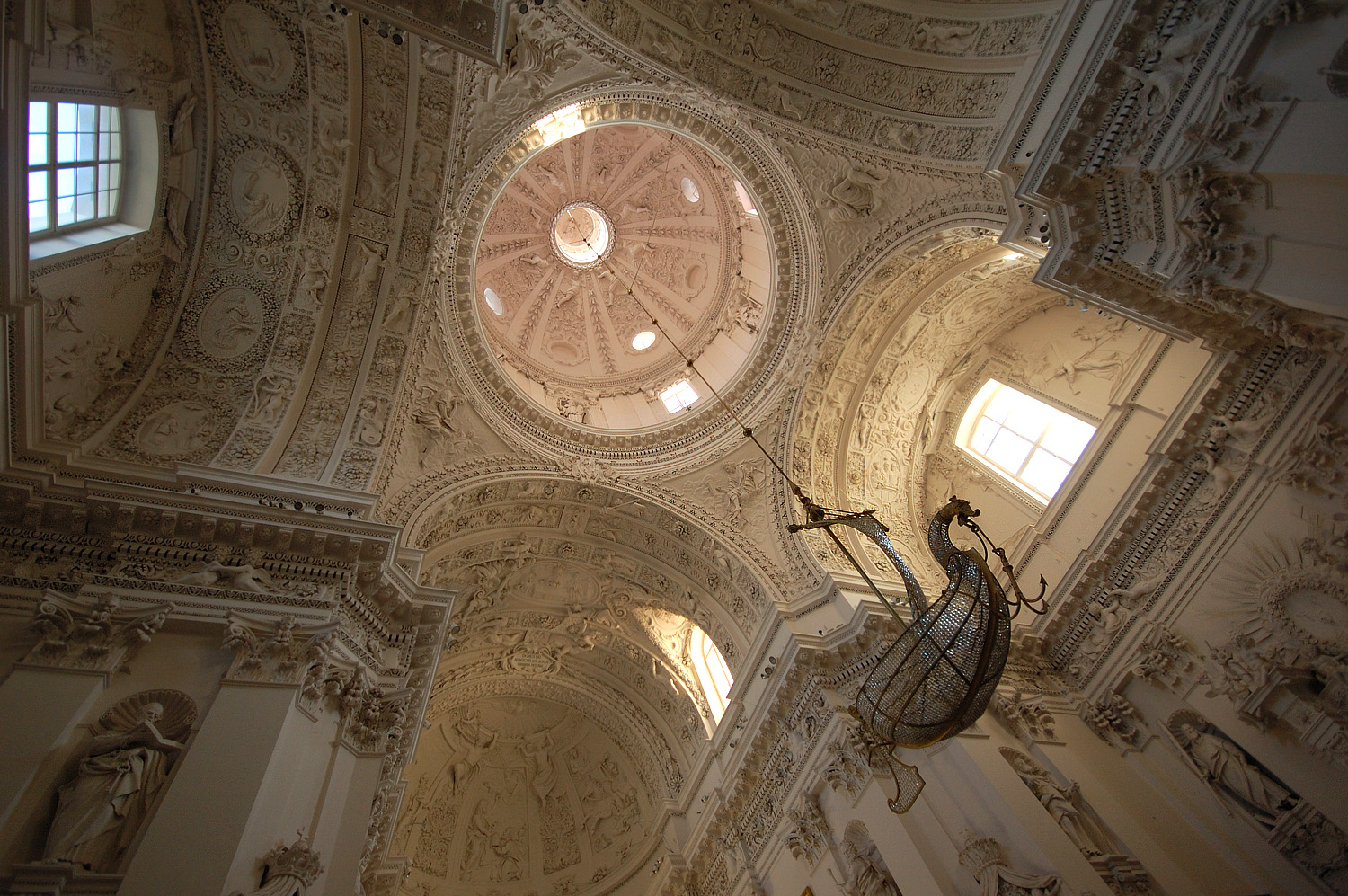
View of the dome with the boat-shaped chandelier

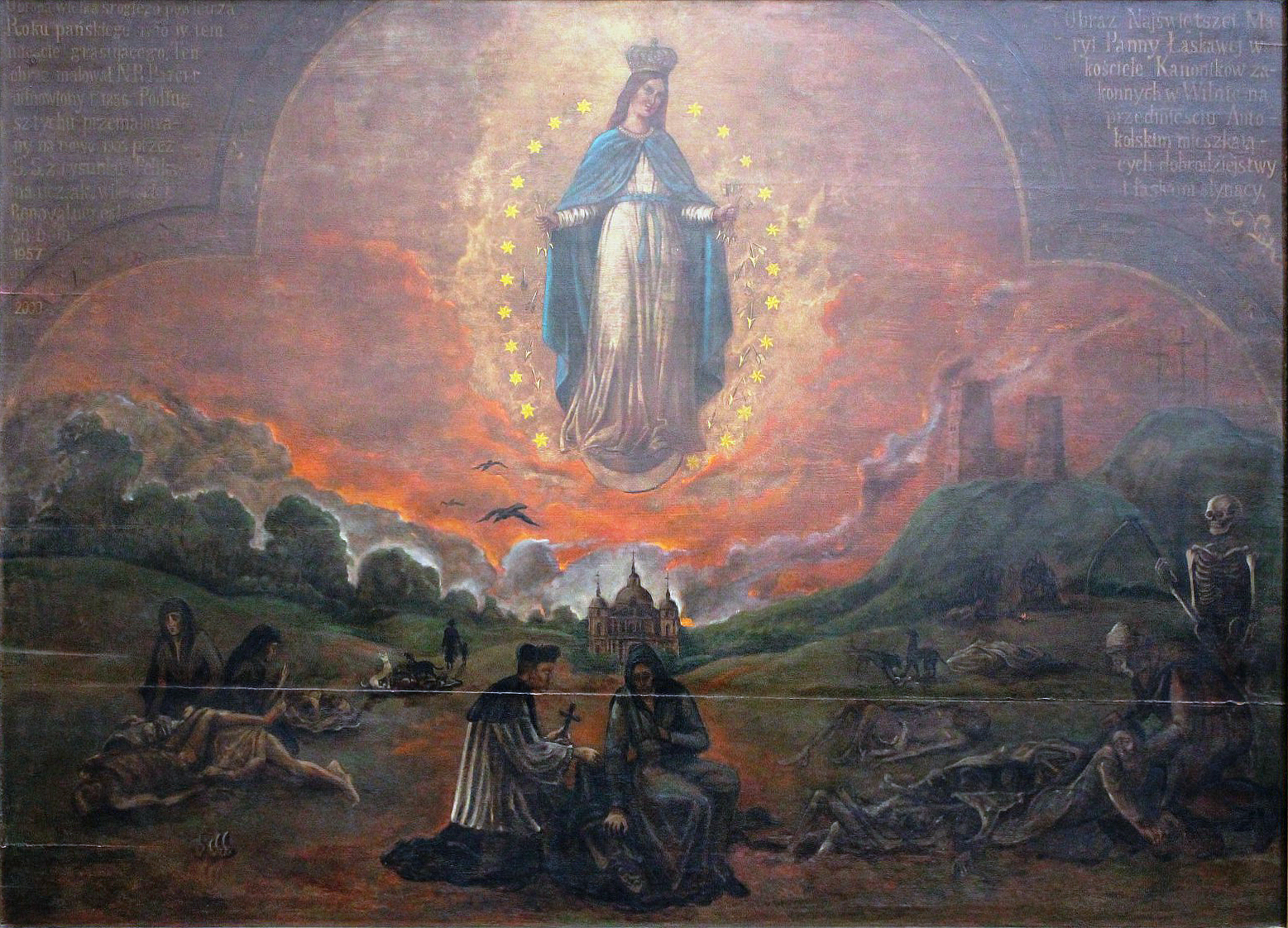
Plague of 1710 in Vilnius

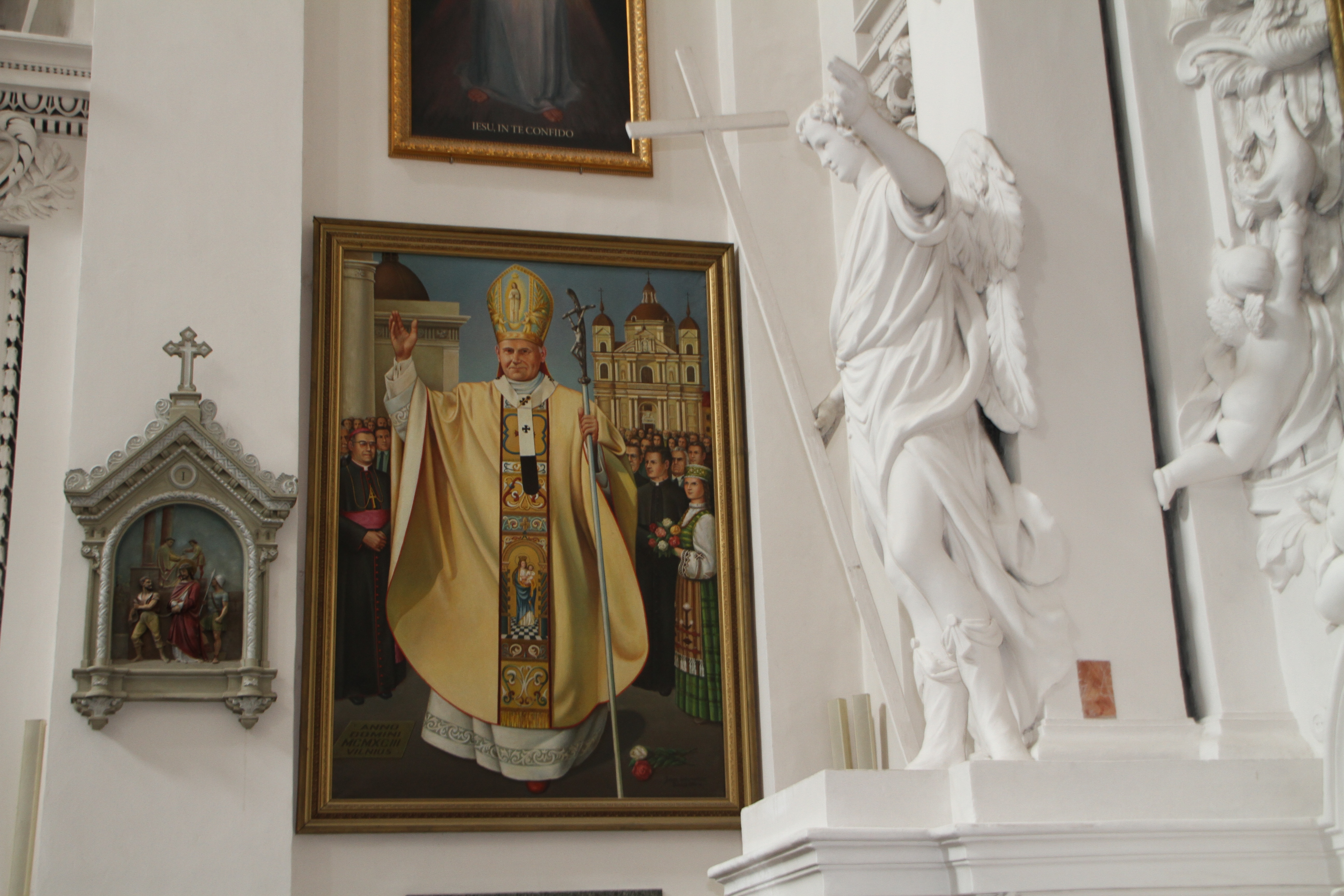
Pope John Paul II painting depicting him in Vilnius

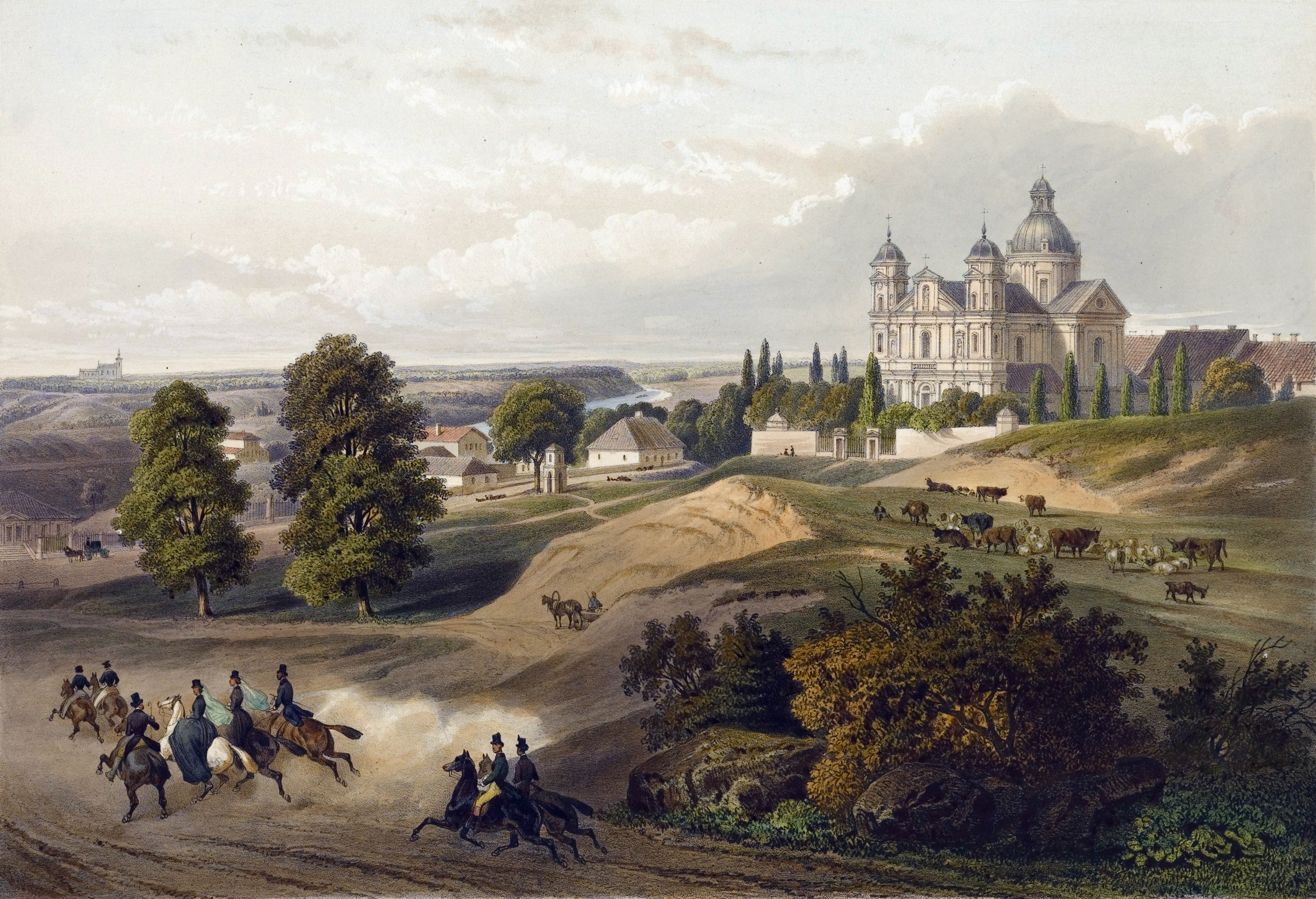
Painting of Antakalnis panorama by Kanutas Ruseckas in 1848

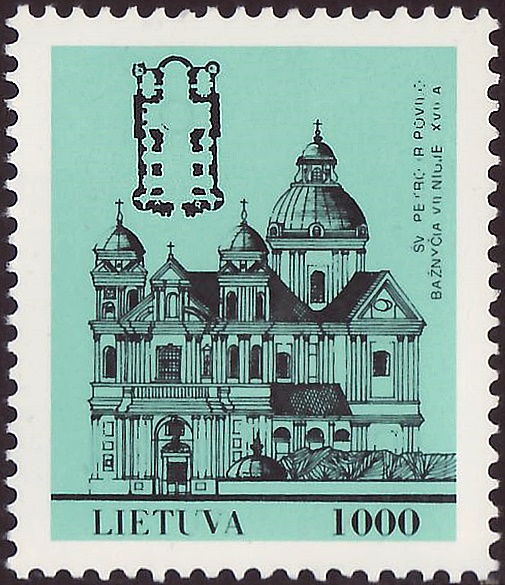
Stamp of Lithuania; 1993; commemorative issue "church architecture - I"; Sts. Peter and Paul's Church, stamp with view and footprint.

== See also ==
- Pažaislis Monastery – another Baroque masterpiece founded by a member of the Pac family
