= Michał Kazimierz Pac =

Polish–Lithuanian nobleman (c. 1624 – 1682)

- Grand Hetman of Lithuania
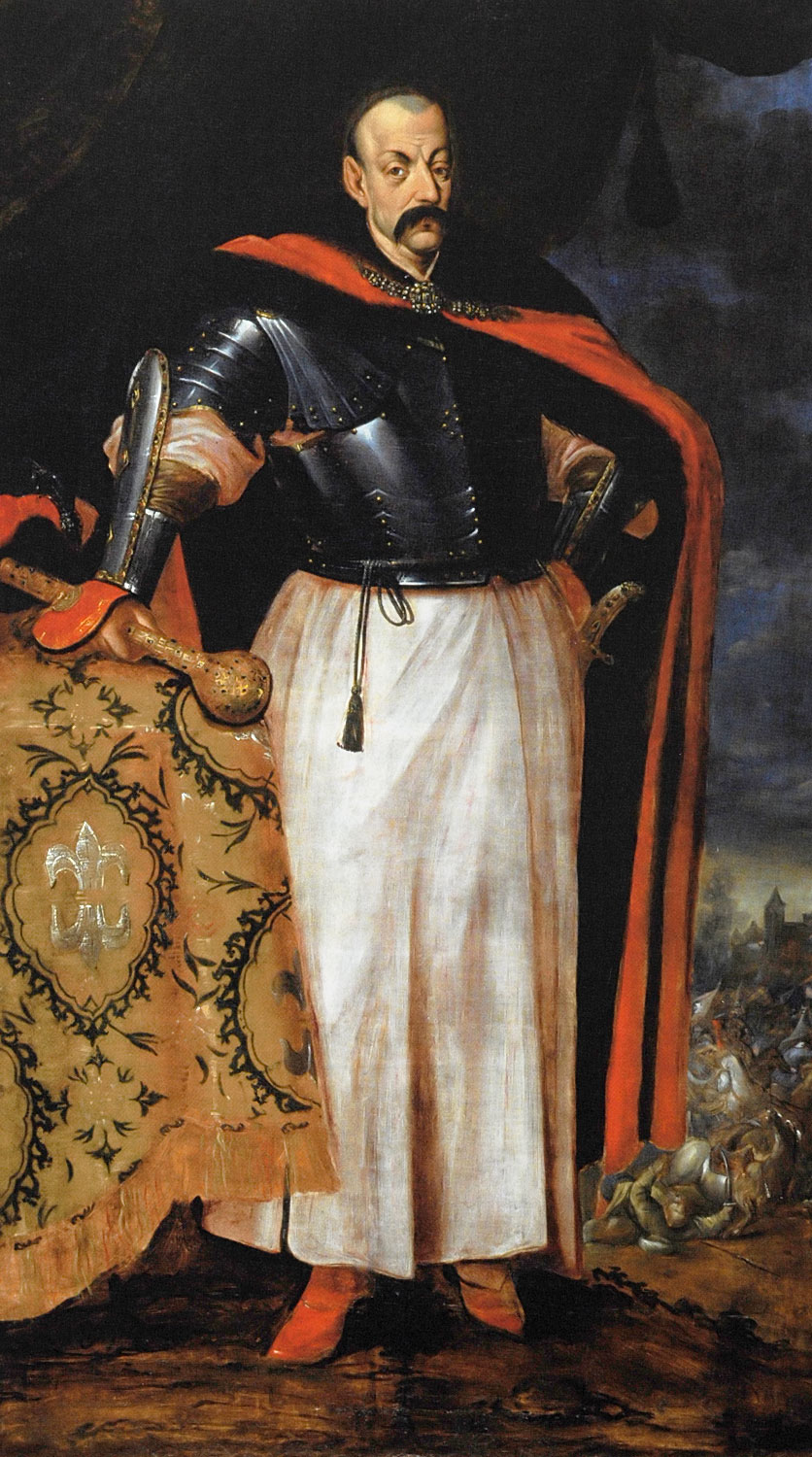

Great Hetman of Lithuania
- Reign: 1663–1667
- Predecessor: Paweł Jan Sapieha
- Successor: Kazimierz Jan Sapieha
- Born: c. 1624
- Died: 4 April 1682; Vokė, Polish–Lithuanian Commonwealth
- Buried: Church of St. Peter and St. Paul, Vilnius
- Noble family: Pac
- Father: Piotr Pac
- Mother: Halszka (Elżbieta) Szemiot

Michał Kazimierz Pac (Lithuanian: Mykolas Kazimieras Pacas; c. 1624 – 4 April 1682) was a nobleman and prominent military leader of the Polish–Lithuanian Commonwealth, and of one the most influential members of the magnate Pac family. Educated by Jesuits and Mikołaj Krzysztof "the Orphan" Radziwiłł, Pac joined the military at a young age and rose through its ranks to fight against Russian, Turkish, and Swedish armies. Throughout his life, Pac was the field hetman of Lithuania, voivode of Smolensk, as well as the great hetman. Known for being a devout and ambitious personality of the Baroque period, Pac was interred below the Church of St. Peter and St. Paul, Vilnius along with a memorial plaque he commissioned.

== Biography ==
=== Early life ===
Michał Kazimierz Pac was born around 1624 in the Polish–Lithuanian Commonwealth. The son of a court treasurer and Voivode of Trakai Piotr Pac and Elžbieta Šemetaitė, Pac was educated by the Jesuits in Vilnius and Braunsberg, and was brought up by Mikołaj Krzysztof "the Orphan" Radziwiłł. In his youth, Pac supposedly fought in a duel with the future king of the Commonwealth, John III Sobieski, to win over a girl.

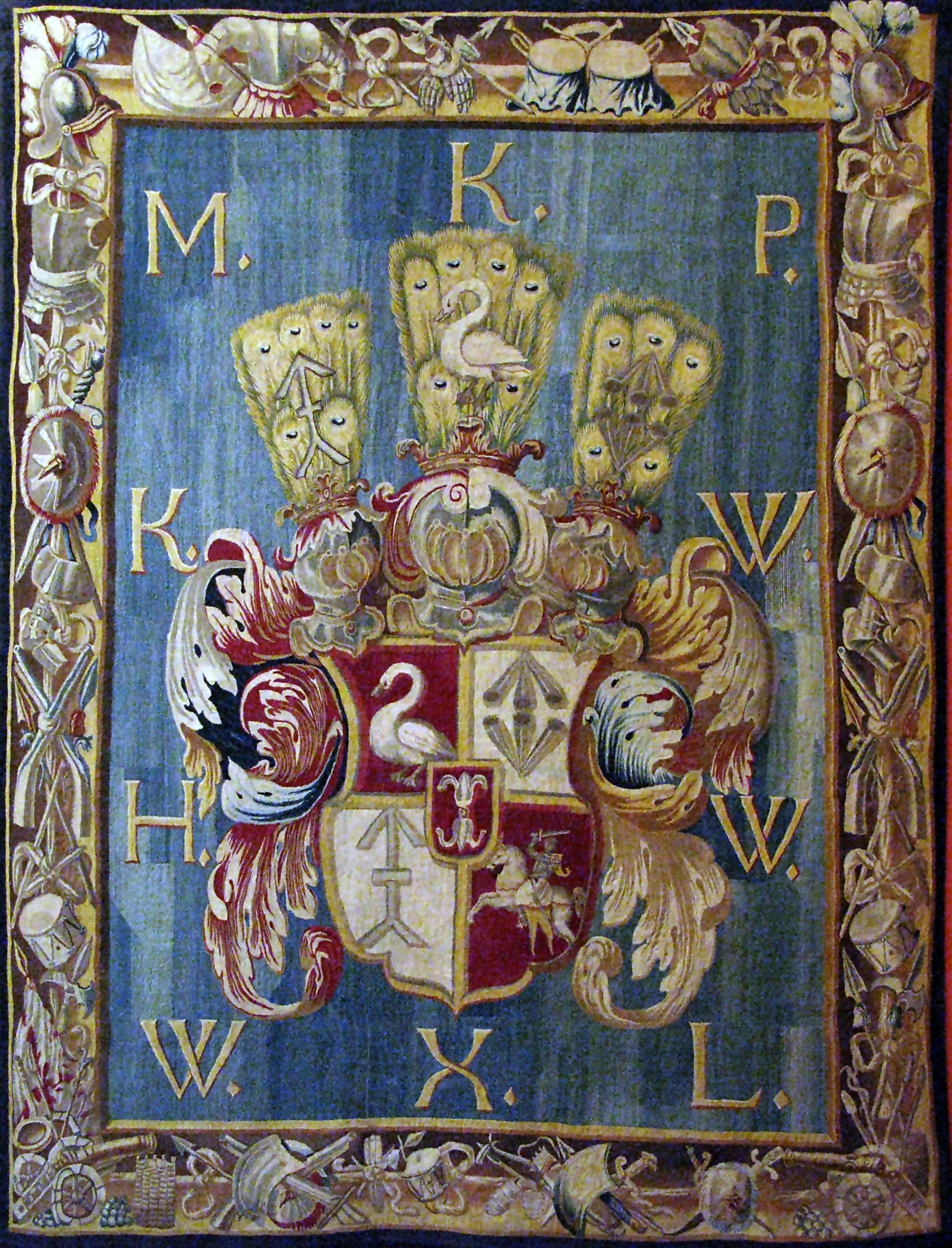
Tapestry with the Arms of Michał Kazimierz Pac

=== Military career ===
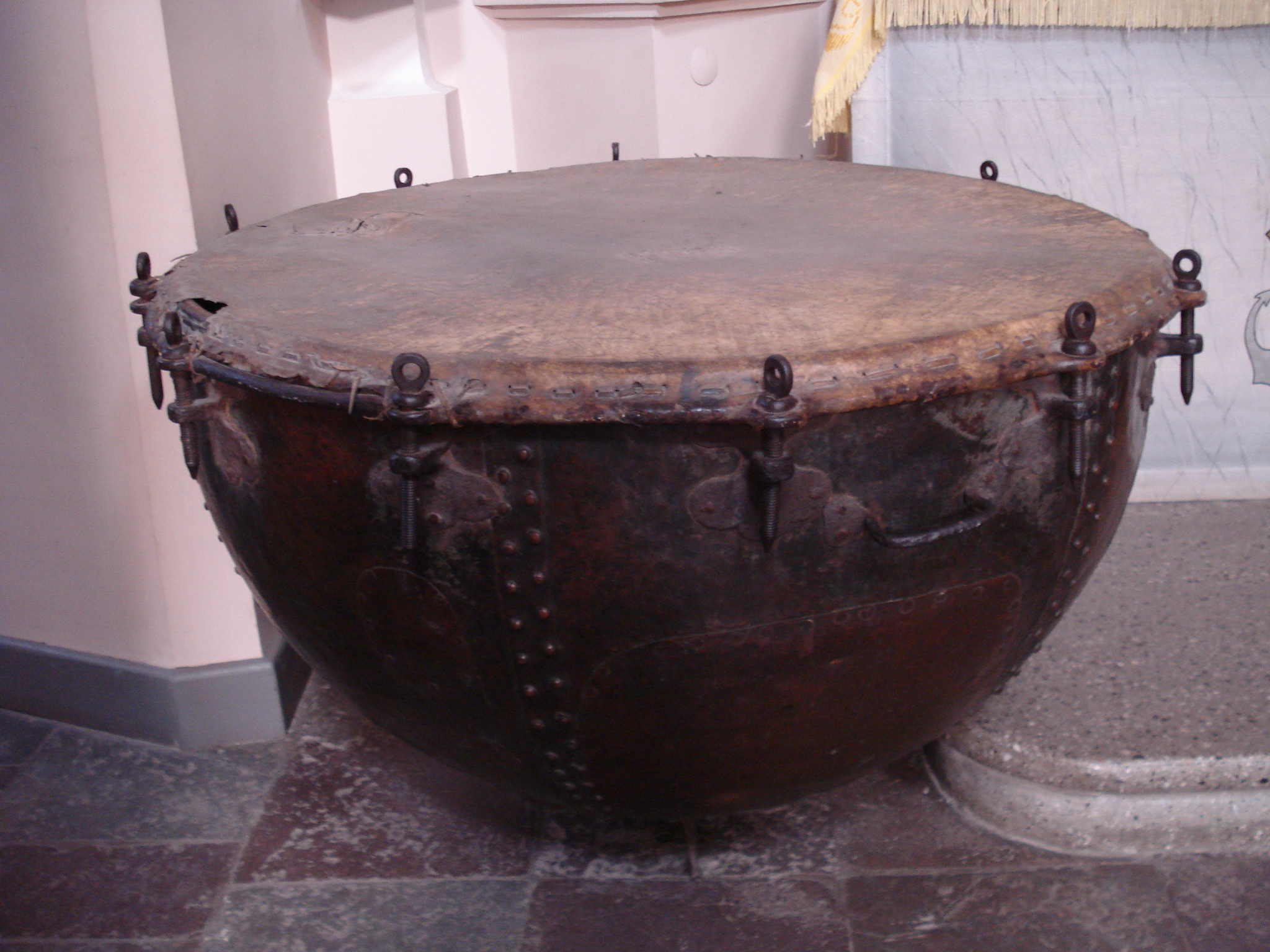
Trophy drum of the Turkish army, brought by Michał Kazimierz Pac from the 1673 war with the Turks

Pac joined the army as a young man and steadily rose through its ranks, becoming a colonel in the Žemaitija division, and later a division commander chosen by the soldiers themselves. In 1648 he fought against rebellious cossacks within the territory of the Polish-Lithuanian Commonwealth. From 1659 to 1663 he was the head of a military camp of the Grand Duchy of Lithuania. In 1663, during the Second Northern War (Deluge), when the territory of the Commonwealth was occupied by Russian and Swedish soldiers, Pac was appointed as the Field Hetman of Lithuania and voivode of Smolensk. During the war with the Russians, abandoned by fellow soldiers, Pac actively wrote letters to the then Great Hetman Paweł Jan Sapieha. Pac led armies against the Russians at Shklow (1660) and Vilnius (1661). From 1658 to 1659, Pac successfully fought against the Swedes in Courland. Pac thoroughly developed the artillery of the army and strengthened the Vilnius castle with his own funds. He was further promoted to Great Hetman in 1667 and voivode of Vilnius in 1669. In 1673, Pac fought in the decisive Battle of Khotyn against the Turks.

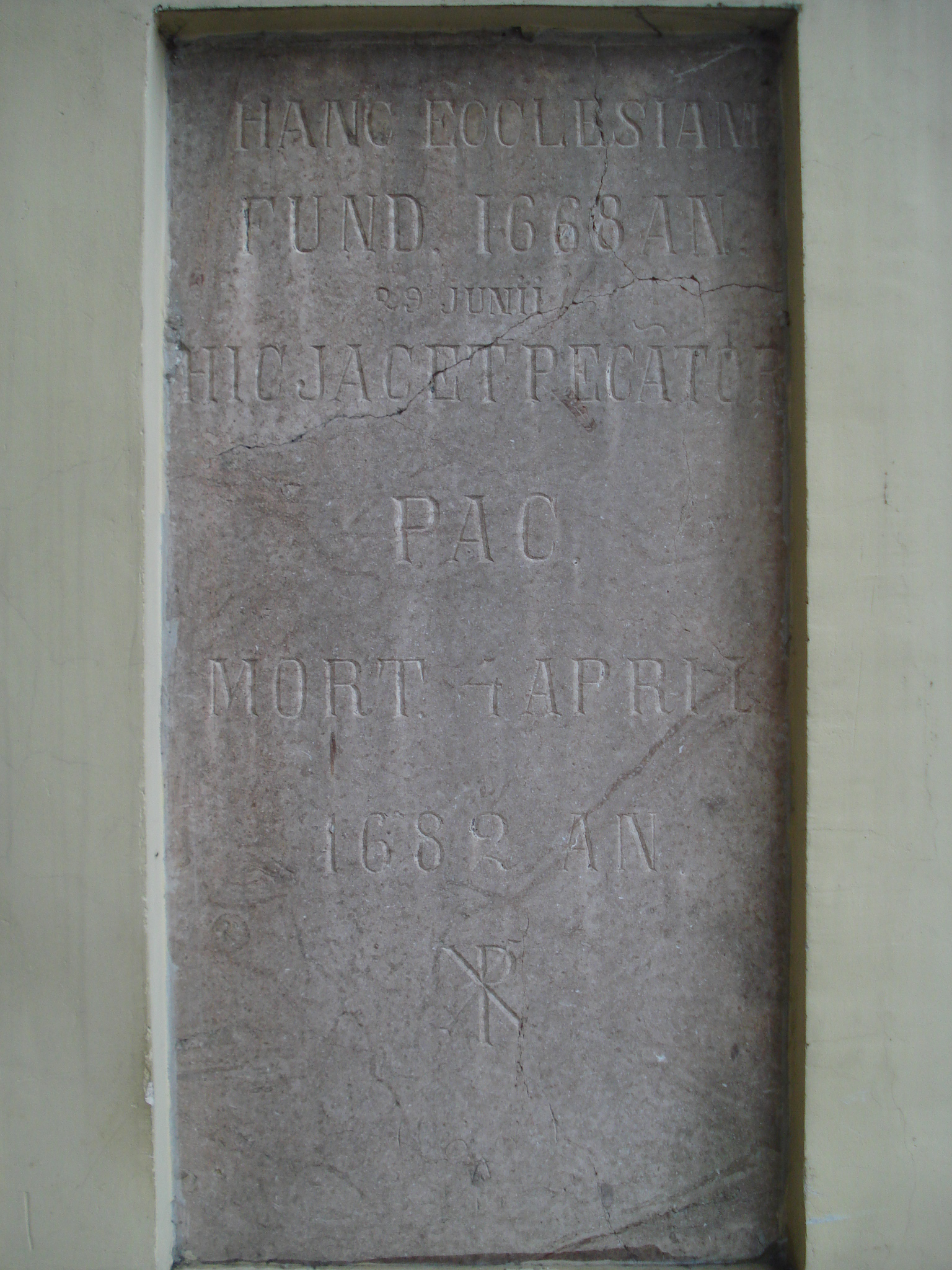
Pac plaque in the Church of St. Peter and St. Paul in Vilnius

Known as a "soldier of Christ" (miles Christi), Pac was a zealous and ambitious military leader; as the commander, he used to receive the Great Hetman Paulius Sapiega only while lying in bed, and constantly argued with king Sobieski and made fun of him in public. A known ascetic, Pac constantly marinated his body. According to contemporaries, he always wore a sharp iron chain with which he tied his body. Pac also opposed Polish Hetmans leading Lithuanian military forces into battle.

=== Later years ===
Pac opposed the election of Michael Korybut Wiśniowiecki to the throne of the Commonwealth. After the death of Wiśniowiecki, he opposed the election of John III Sobieski, creating an opposition group consisting of the Oginski magnate family and Krzysztof Zygmunt Pac against the Radziwiłł and Sapiehas. When it was discovered that Pac plotted with Austria and Brandenburg against Sobieski himself, he fell from public favor. Michał Kazimierz Pac funded the construction of St. Peter and St. Paul Church in Vilnius, considered to be one of the best examples of Baroque architecture in Europe.

Michał Kazimierz Pac died on 4 April 1682 in Vokė, near Vilnius. He wished for his burial to be accompanied by poor men and monks. Following his wishes, he was interred in the church vestibule and his grave was marked with a Latin inscription Hic iacet pecator (English: Here lies a sinner).
