= Kazimierz Michał Pac =

Polish nobleman (died 1719)

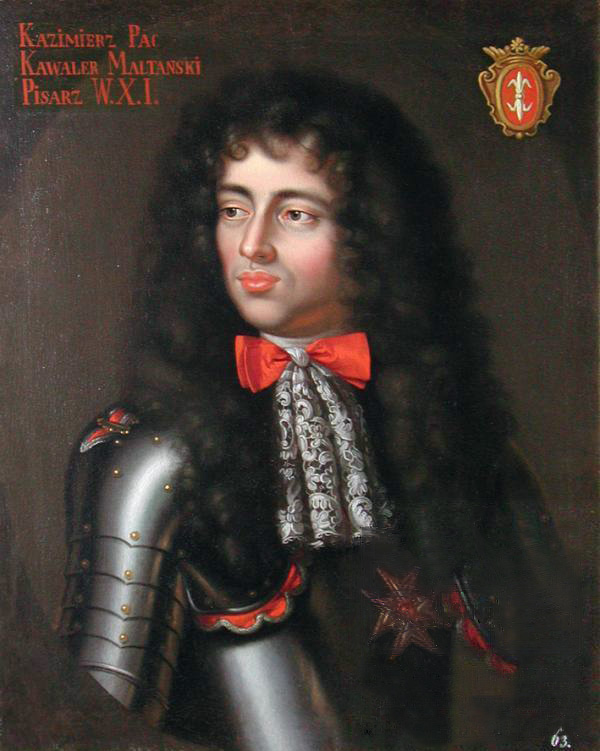
- Coat of arms: Gozdawa
- Died: 1719
- Noble family: Pac
- Father: Hieronim Dominik Pac
- Mother: Anna Woyna

Kazimierz Michał Pac (died 1719) was a Polish nobleman, Great Notary of Lithuania, Knight of Malta, Court Marshal of Lithuania from 1708 until 1709.
