= Krzysztof Zygmunt Pac =

- Grand Chancellor of Lithuania
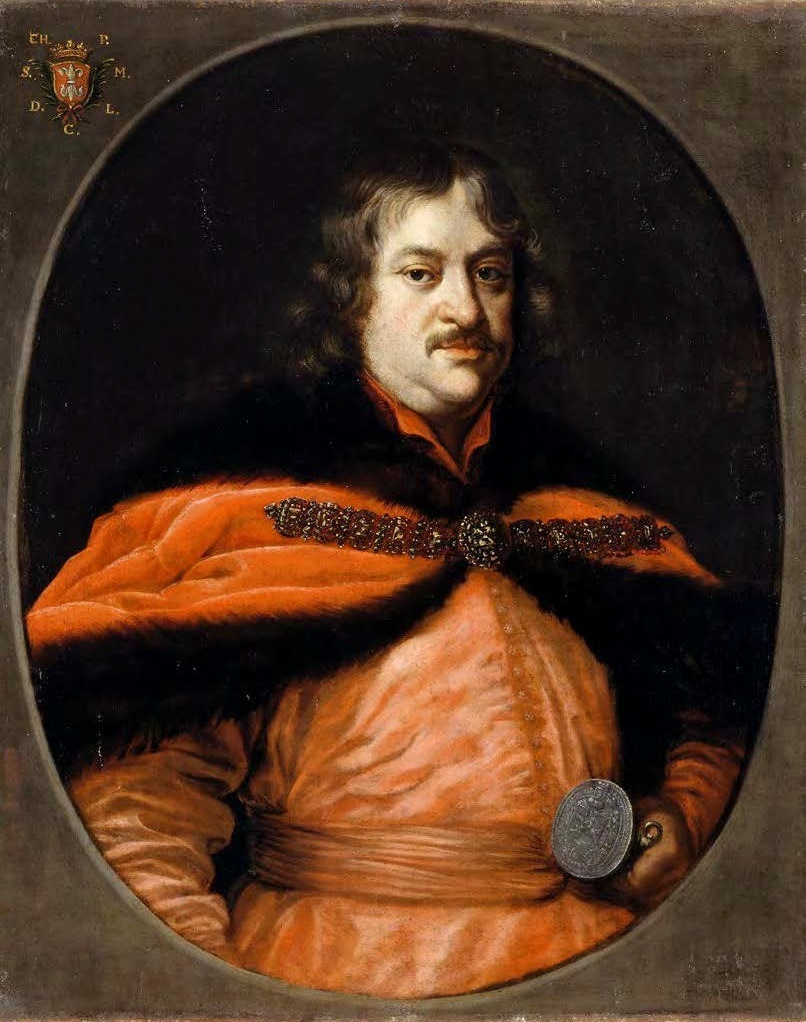
- Coat of arms: Gozdawa
- Born: 1621
- Died: 10 January 1684 (aged 62–63); Warsaw, Kingdom of Poland
- Noble family: Pac
- Spouse: Klara Isabella de Mailly
- Father: Stefan Pac
- Mother: Anna from Dusetos

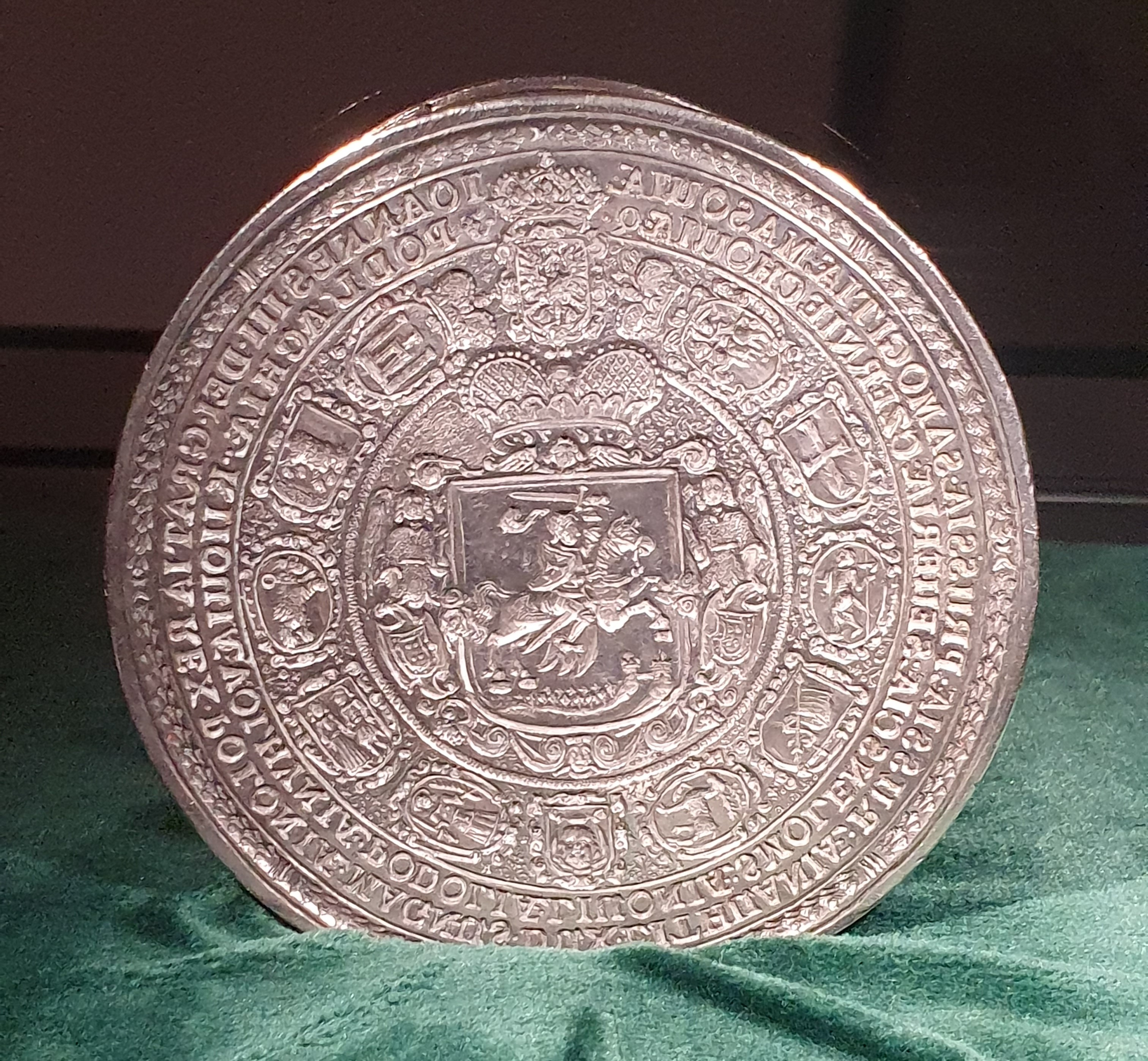
Silver stamp of the Great Seal of Lithuania, used by Lithuanian Grand Chancellor Krzysztof Zygmunt Pac, 1676

Krzysztof Zygmunt Pac (Lithuanian: Kristupas Zigmantas Pacas; 1621–1684) was a nobleman and statesman of Grand Duchy of Lithuania and the Grand Chancellor (1658–1684) of the Grand Duchy of Lithuania.

He was the brother of Michał Kazimierz Pac, the Grand Hetman of Lithuania (1667–1682) who sponsored St Peter and St Paul's Church in Vilnius, a masterpiece of Baroque architecture within the former Polish–Lithuanian Commonwealth. After their deaths, the influence of the Pac family rapidly deteriorated.

Krzysztof Zygmunt Pac was an educated and intellectual man. He studied in Kraków, Liège, and for eight years at the University of Perugia in Florence, Italy. When he returned to the Commonwealth he obtained permission from Rome to establish a monastery for the Order of Camaldolese. The construction started in 1664 and eventually the completed monastery, now known as the Pažaislis Monastery, is considered to be one of the best examples of Baroque architecture in the lands of present-day Lithuania. Moreover, he funded the construction of a Baroque church in Jieznas, Lithuania.

In 1673 Krzysztof Pac succeeded in passing a law stating that the convention of every third Sejm of the Polish–Lithuanian Commonwealth should take place in Grodno, a city in the Grand Duchy of Lithuania. He was also appointed Vilkaviškis elder.

He was married to Klara Isabelle de Mailly (~1631/35-1685), an authoritative woman. Their first-born son died at the age of eight days and they had no other children. Instead, Krzysztof Pac helped to launch his nephew's political career; he later continued to sponsor the expansion of the Pažaislis Monastery.

Pac, his wife and their son, were all buried in the cemetery of the Pažaislis Monastery. Their graves were robbed and vandalized several times during the monastery's eventful and long history. In 2003 they were properly reburied in a ceremony led by the archbishop of Kaunas Sigitas Tamkevičius.

== See also ==
- Lithuanian nobility
