= House of Pac =

Polish noble family

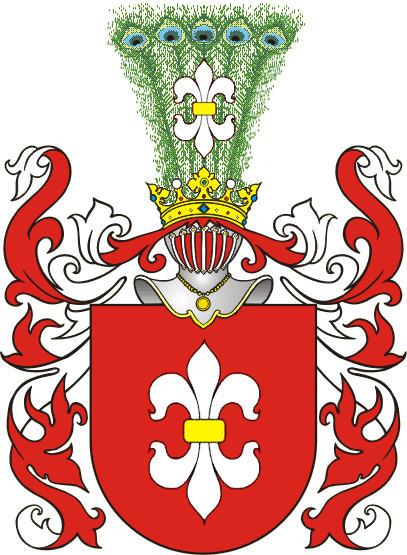
Coat of arms of Gozdawa

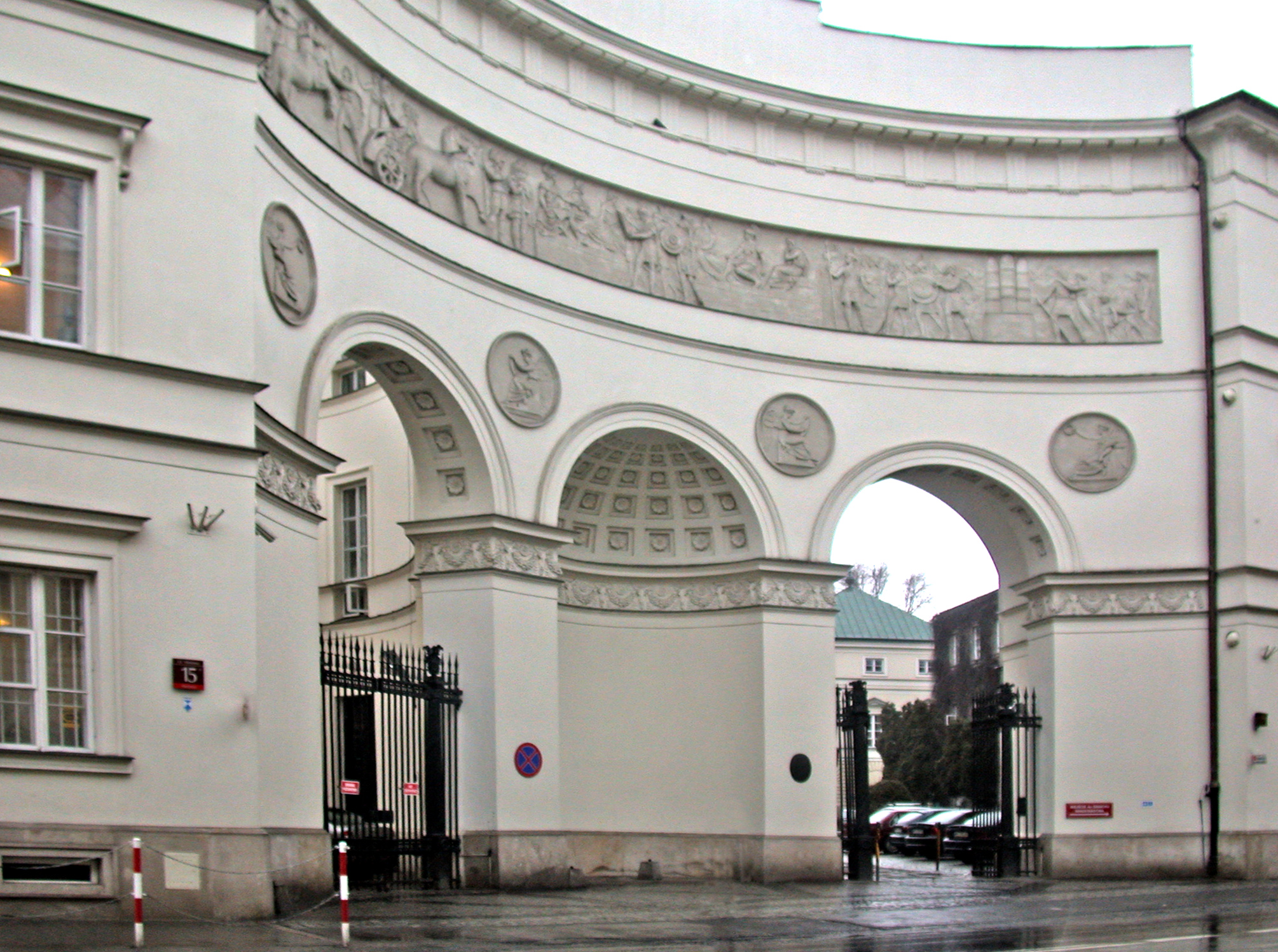
Palace of the Pac family in Warsaw.

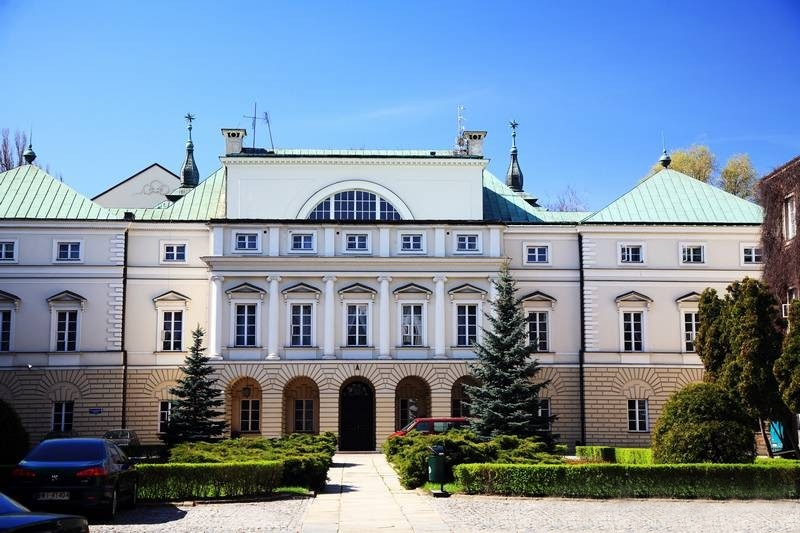
Palace of the Pac family in Warsaw.

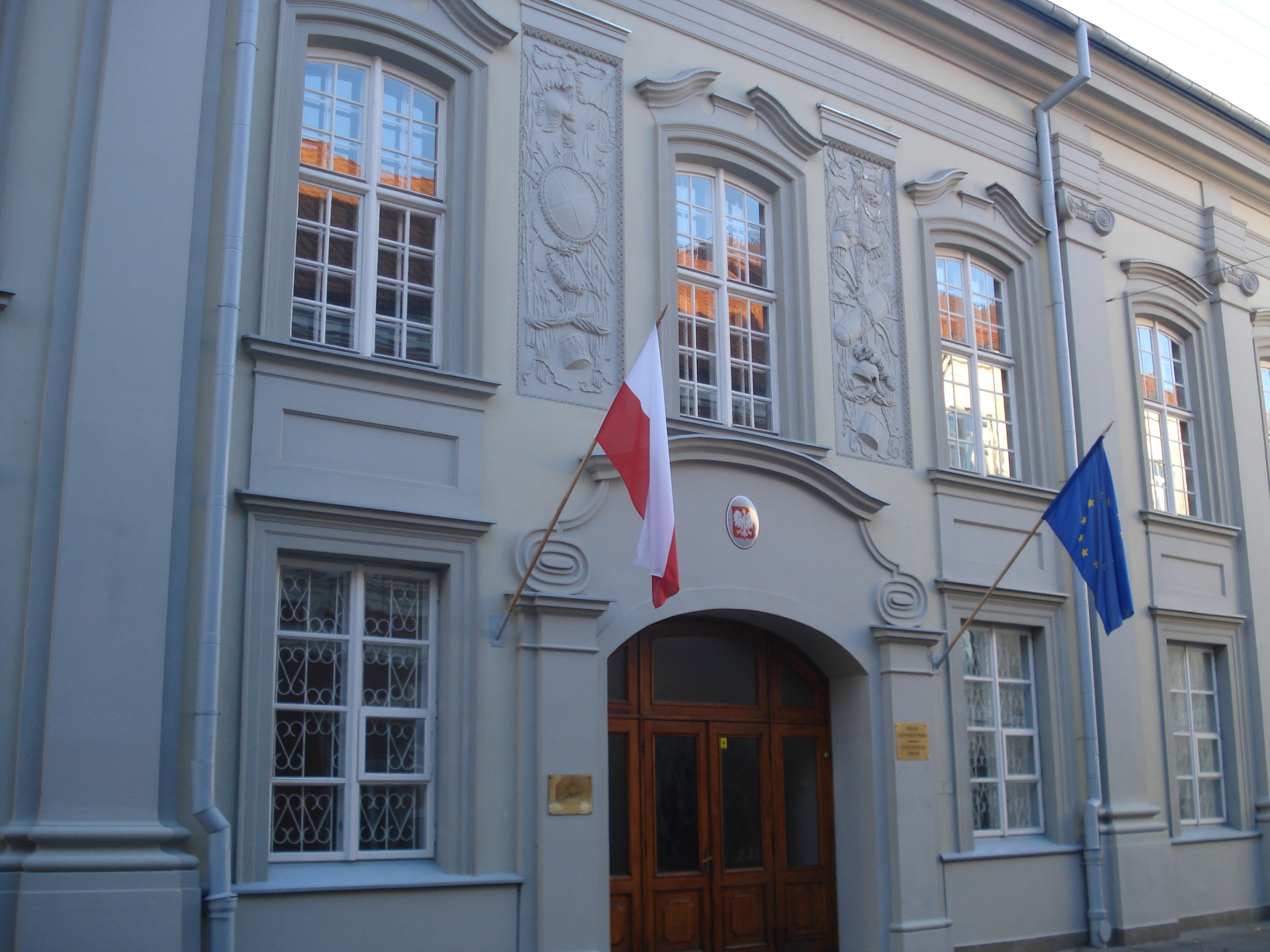
Palace of the Pac family in Vilnius, now Polish embassy

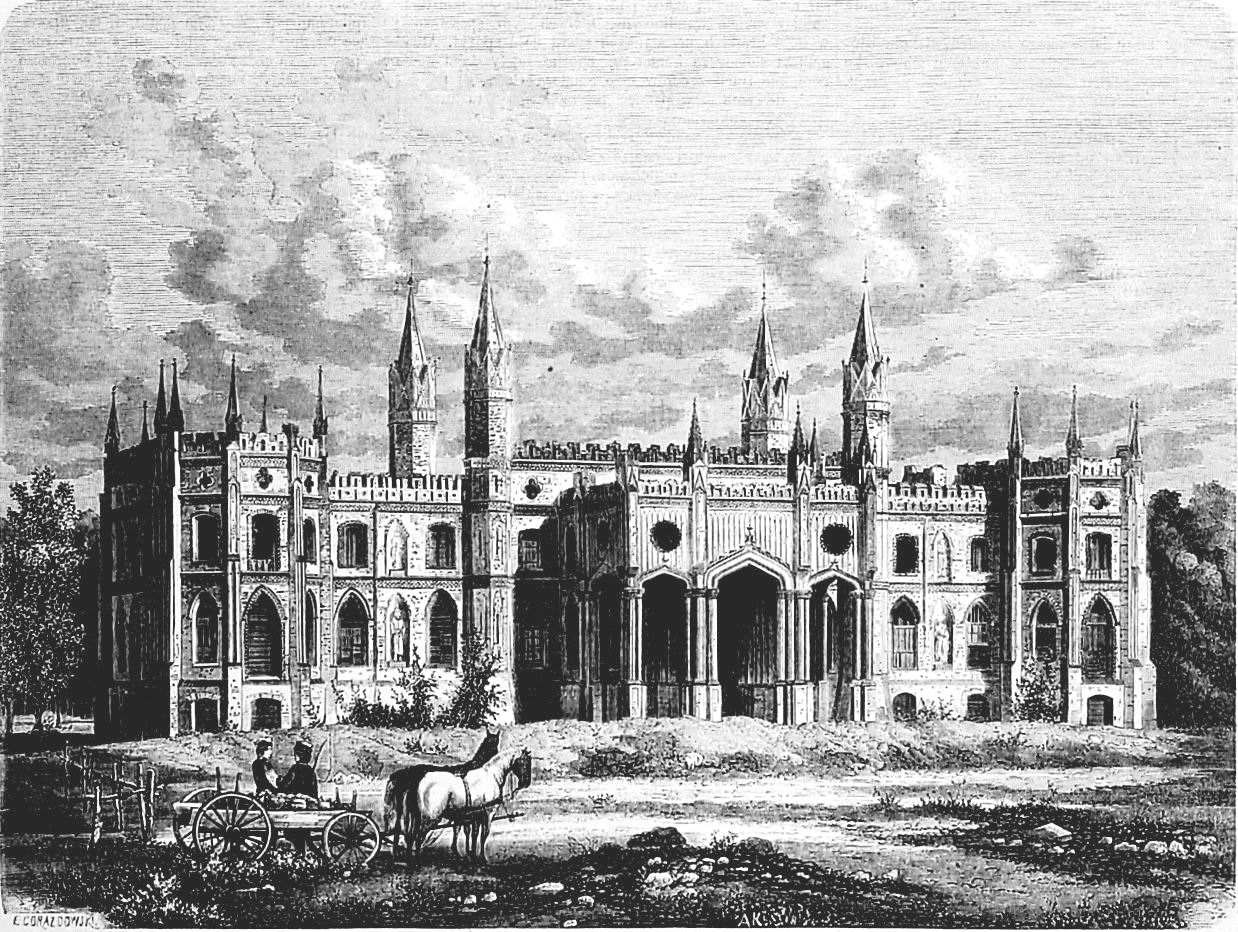
Pac Palace in Dowspuda

The House of Pac or Pacowie (Polish: Pacowie, Lithuanian: Pacai, Belarusian: Па́цы, romanized: Patsy) was one of the most influential noble families in the Polish–Lithuanian Commonwealth. Numerous high-ranking officials of the Commonwealth came from their ranks. Their coat of arms was Gozdawa.

The family reached the height of its influence during the second half of the 17th century. Their lands were located mainly in Hrodna (Polish: Grodno, Lithuanian: Gardinas) and Lida (Lithuanian: Lyda).

The family's ancestor Kimantas was mentioned in the privilege of 1388 issued by Grand Duke of Lithuania Vytautas the Great as Kymunt. The estate of the family in proximity of Grodno was mentioned in the road description, charted by the Teutonic Knights, as Kymundsdorf. Kimantas and his son Daukša (Dowkszewicz) were among the signatories of the Union of Vilnius and Radom of 1401. Daukša's son Pacas Daukšaitis is considered the founder of the family; his descendants took his first name as their family name, beginning with his son Jerzy Pac (d. 1505/6).

Their lands were concentrated in the southern Lithuania propria, around the county of Jieznas. The family sponsored the construction of several notable examples of Baroque architecture in Lithuania; the most significant of these, St Peter and St Paul's Church in Vilnius and the Monastery of Pažaislis, were commissioned by family members.

In 1753, following a visit to the Pazzi household in Florence, Stefan Pac advanced the theory that the two families were related. The Pacs later dedicated a church to Magdalena de Pazzi. The supposed ancestry was mentioned by 19th century authors, including Balzac.

The family's influence was overwhelmed in the late 17th century by that of the Sapiehas. Michał Kazimierz Pac (1624–1682) was a Grand Hetman of Lithuania and Voivode of Wilno, Krzysztof Zygmunt Pac (1621–1684), Grand Chancellor of Lithuania, Mikołaj Stefan Pac (?-1684), voivode of Trakai and bishop of Vilnius, and Kazmierz Pac (?-1695), bishop of Samogitia. During their adulthood, in late 17th century, they exerted major influence on the politics of the Grand Duchy. After their childless deaths, the Pac family was weakened, and much of their influence passed to others, primarily the Sapiehas. The last notable member of the Pac family was Ludwik Michał Pac (1778–1835), who fought in the November Uprising. After its failure, with his estates confiscated by the Russians, he emigrated to France.

== Notable family members ==
- Jerzy Pac (d. c. 1505), voivode of Kijów (Kyiv), namiestnik, the first bearer of the family name
- Mikołaj Pac (c. 1527-1585) – bishop of Kijów, castelan of Smoleńsk
- Dominik Pac (d. 1579), member of the Sejm, castelan of Smoleńsk
- Stanisław Pac (d. 1588), podstoli, voivode Witebsk
- Mikołaj Pac (1570-1624), Bishop of Żmudź
- Piotr Pac (c. 1570-1642), podskarbi, voivode of Troki
- Mikołaj Pac (d.1545-/6), łowczy, podkomorzy, voivode of Podlasie
- Jan Pac (d. 1610) – cześnik, ciwun of Wilno, voivode of Mińsk
- Stefan Pac (c.1587-1640), Grand Treasurer and Deputy Chancellor of Lithuania
- Samuel Pac (c. 1590-1627), rotmistrz of Husaria, chorąży
- Paweł Pac (d. 1595), castelan of Witebsk and Wilno, voivode of Mścisław
- Jan Samuel Pac (c. 1616-1654), podstoli, member of the Sejm
- Jan Kazimierz Pac (d. 1653), writer, member of the Sejm
- Bonifacy Teofil Pac (d. 1678), Oboźny of Lithuania
- Jan Kazimierz Pac (d. 1696/7), Chorąży of Lithuania
- Krzysztof Zygmunt Pac (1621–1684), Grand Chancellor of Lithuania
- Mikołaj Stefan Pac (c. 1623-1684), voivode of Troki, castelan, bishop of Wilno
- Michał Kazimierz Pac (1624–1682), Grand Hetman of Lithuania
- Kazimierz Pac (d. 1695), Bishop of Żmudź
- Konstanty Władysław Pac (d. 1686), chorąży-pułkownik
- Piotr Michał Pac (d. 1696), starost of Żmudź
- Feliks Pac (c. 1615 – c. 1700), member of the Sejm, Podkomorzy of Lithuania
- Jan Krzysztof Pac (d. 1702), podkomorzy, member of the Sejm
- Kazimierz Michał Pac (d. 1719), Great Notary of Lithuania
- Krzysztof Konstanty Pac (d. 1725), Great Notary of Lithuania, castelan of Połock
- Michał Jan Pac (1730-1787), starost, Marshal of the Bar Confederation
- Józef Piotr Pac (c. 1736-1797), general, member of the Sejm
- Michał Pac (1754-1800) – starost of Kowieńsk, member of the Sejm
- Ludwik Michał Pac (1780-1835), general, voivode
- Józef Franciszek Pac (d. 1764), castelan of Żmudź
- Michał Kazimierz Pac (d. 1724), starost, castelan of Połock
- Ignacy Pac (d. 1765), podstoli
- Antoni Michał Pac (d. 1774), writer, member of the Sejm
- Ludwik Michał Pac (1778–1835), general of the Napoleon's Grande Armée

== See also ==
- Lithuanian nobility
