= Pažaislis Monastery =

Monastery complex in Lithuania

- Pažaislio vienuolynas
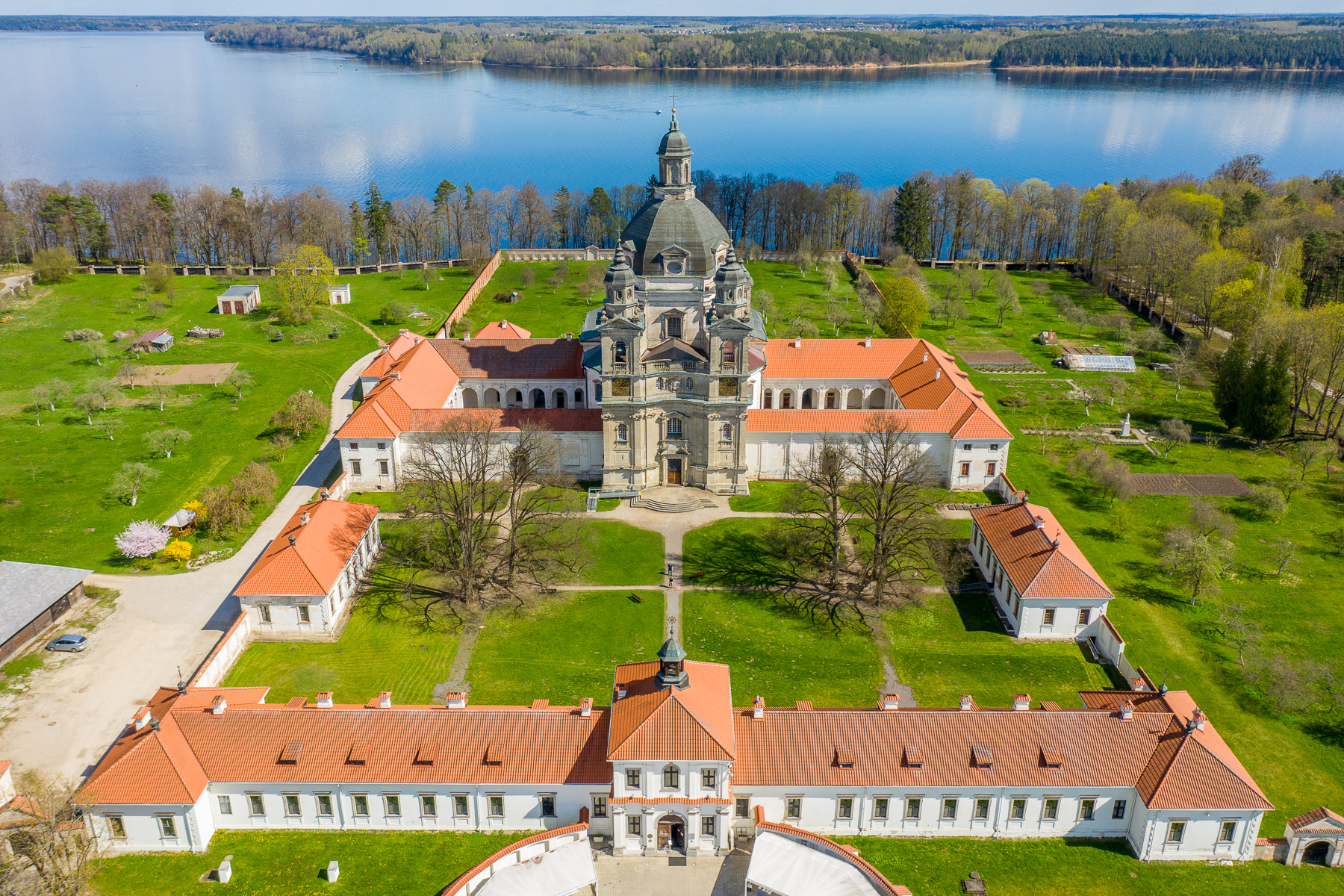
- Aerial view of Pažaislis Monastery

- Location within Lithuania

Monastery information
- Full name: Pažaislis Monastery and Church of the Visitation of the Blessed Virgin Mary
- Other name: Monte Pacis
- Order: Sisters of St. Casimir (present); formerly Camaldolese
- Denomination: Catholic Church
- Established: 1664
- Reestablished: 1920; 1992
- Dedication: Visitation of the Blessed Virgin Mary
- Consecrated: 15 October 1712 (church)

People
- Founder: Krzysztof Zygmunt Pac

Architecture
- Status: Active monastery
- Style: Baroque
- Groundbreaking: 1667

Site
- Location: T. Masiulio g. 31, Kaunas
- Country: Lithuania
- Coordinates: 54°52′35″N 24°01′19″E
- Website: www.pazaislis.org

Pažaislis Monastery and the Church of the Visitation (Lithuanian: Pažaislio vienuolynas ir Švenčiausios Mergelės Marijos apsilankymo pas Elžbietą bažnyčia, Polish: Klasztor w Pożajściu) form the largest monastery complex in Lithuania, and the most renowned example of Baroque architecture in the country. The church is the most marble-decorated Baroque church of the former Grand Duchy of Lithuania.

It is situated in the Pažaislis neighborhood of the Petrašiūnai elderate of Kaunas, Lithuania, on a peninsula in the Kaunas Reservoir. It was declared a cultural monument and a site of Catholic pilgrimage in Lithuania. In 2021, Pažaislis Church and Monastery Complex was awarded as the best European Film location in 2020 during the 2021 Berlin International Film Festival.

== History ==
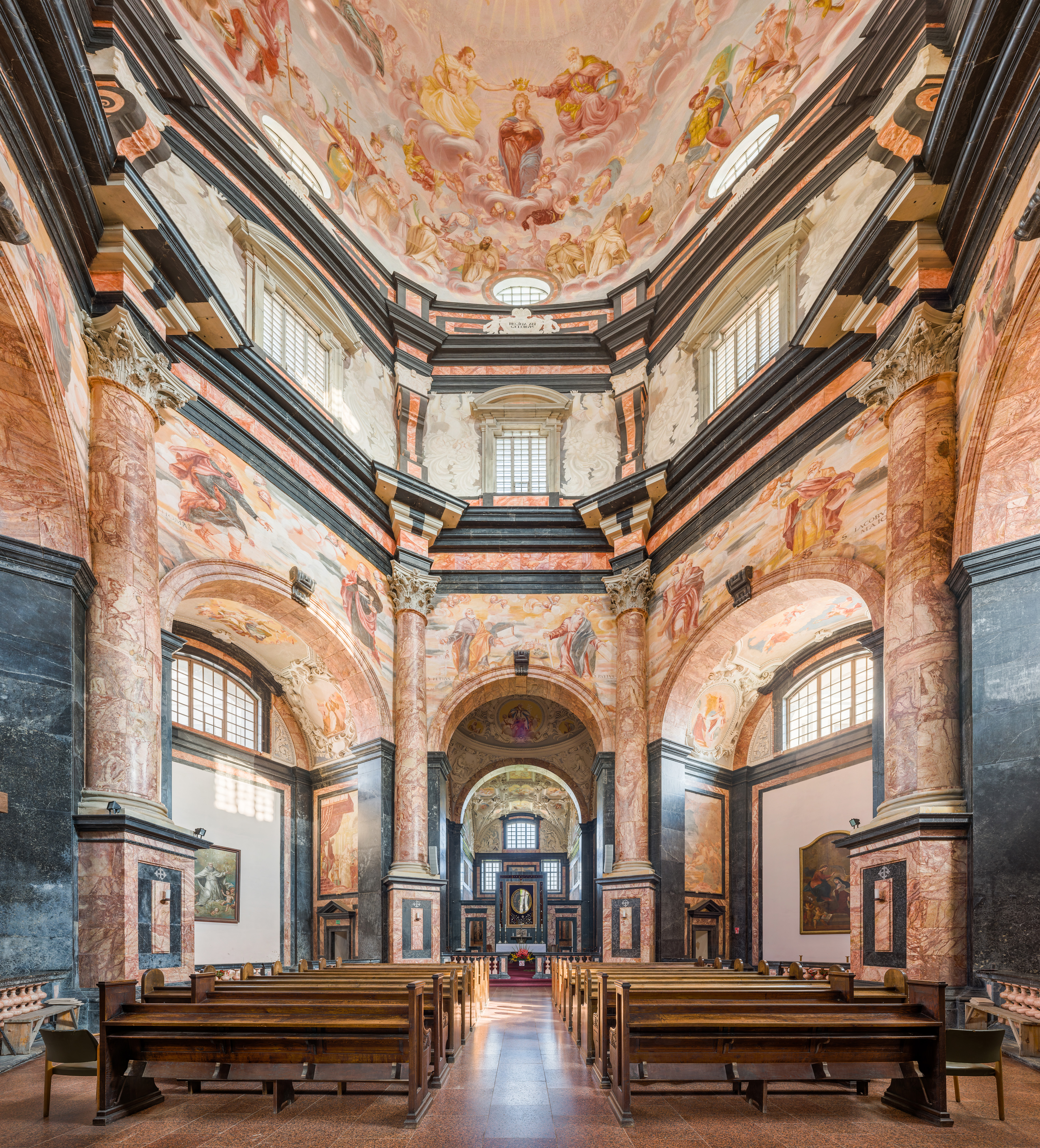
Pažaislis interior

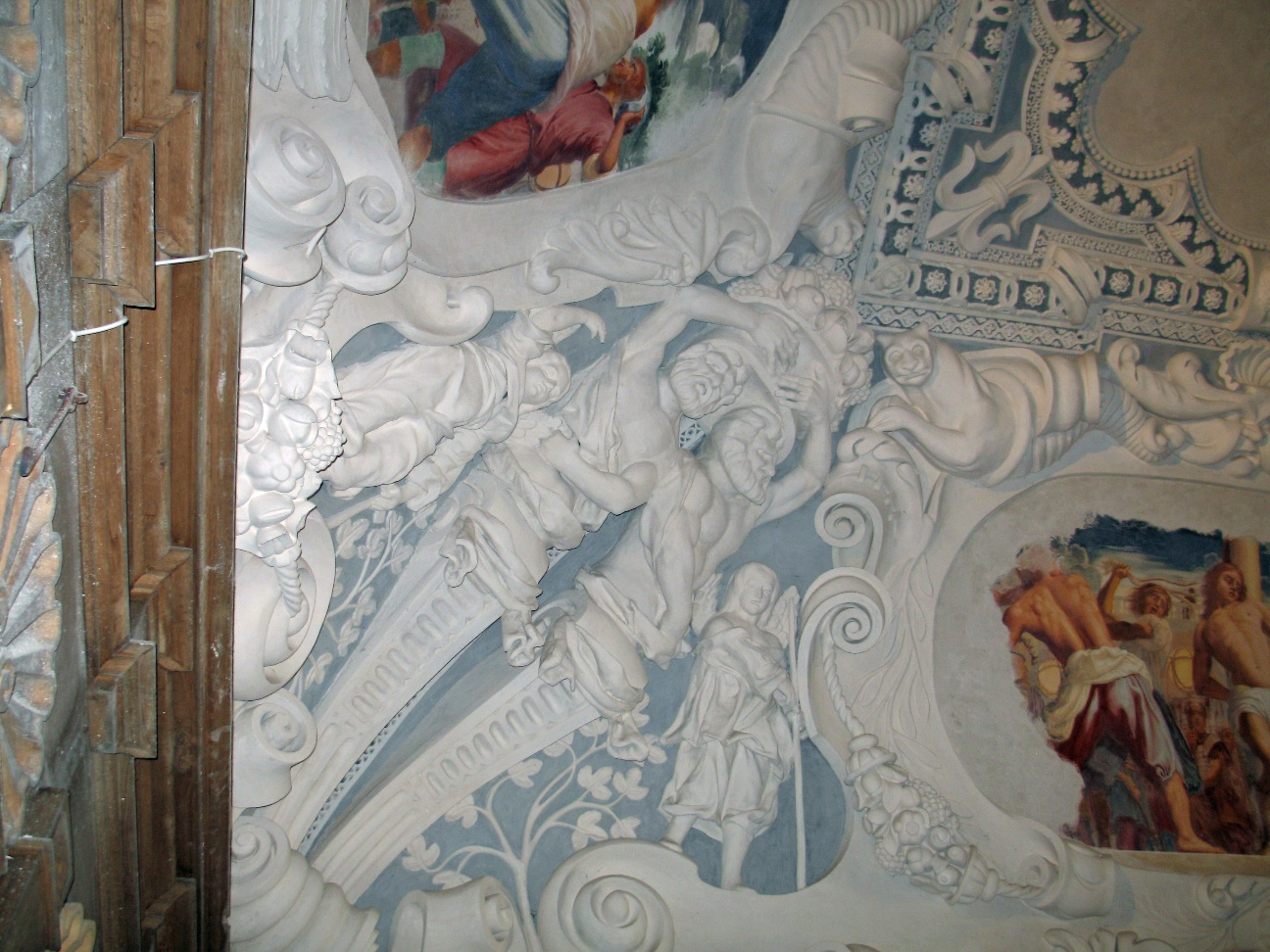
Decor of Pažaislis Monastery

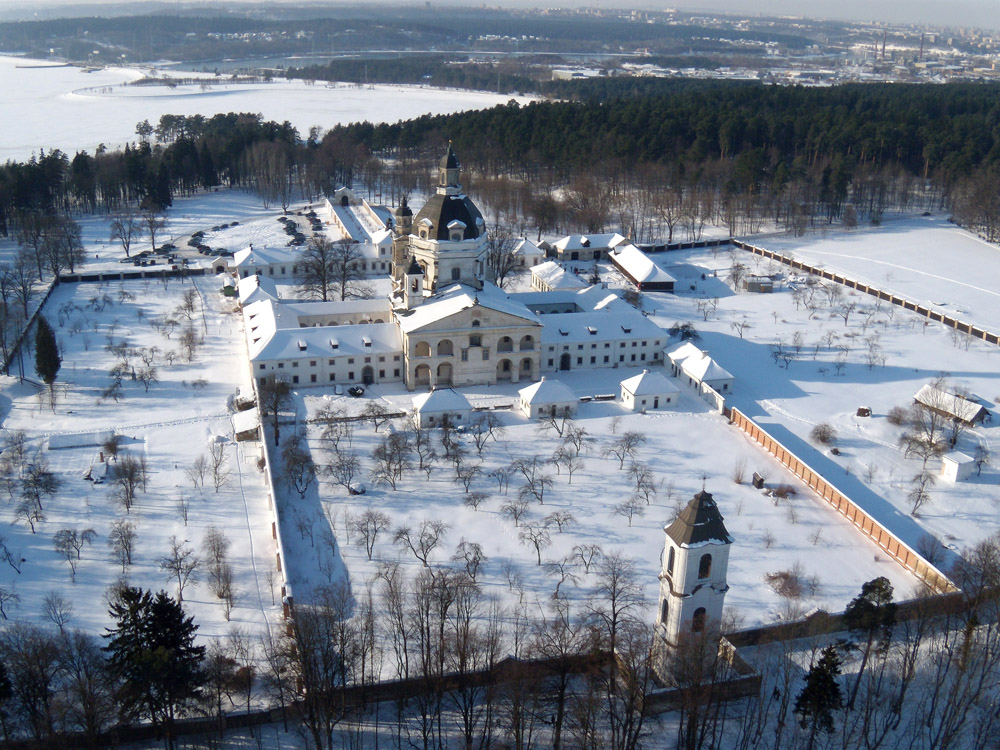
Pažaislis Monastery in winter

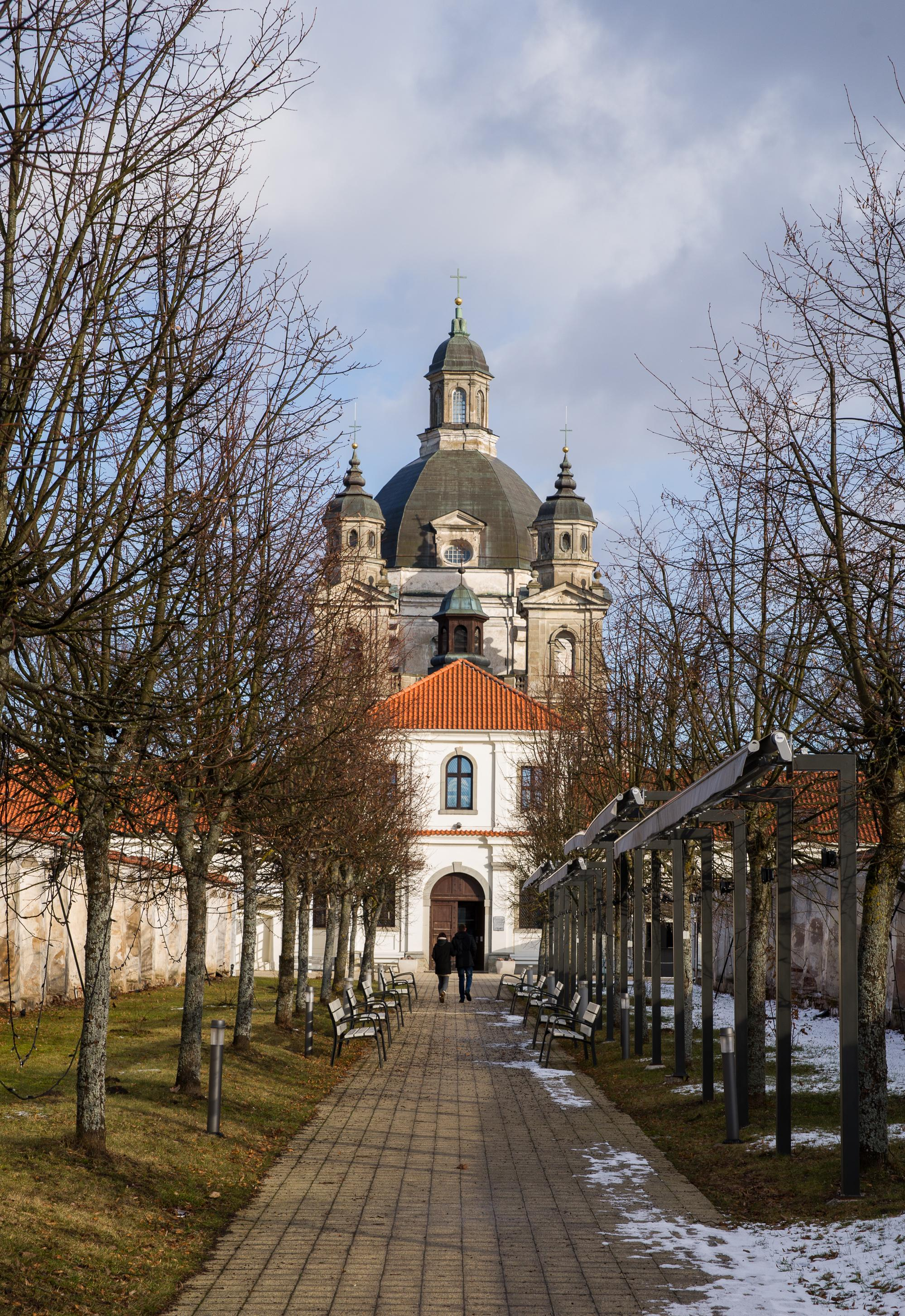
Pažaislis in winter

Church of the Visitation in the monastery of Pažaislis, Kaunas

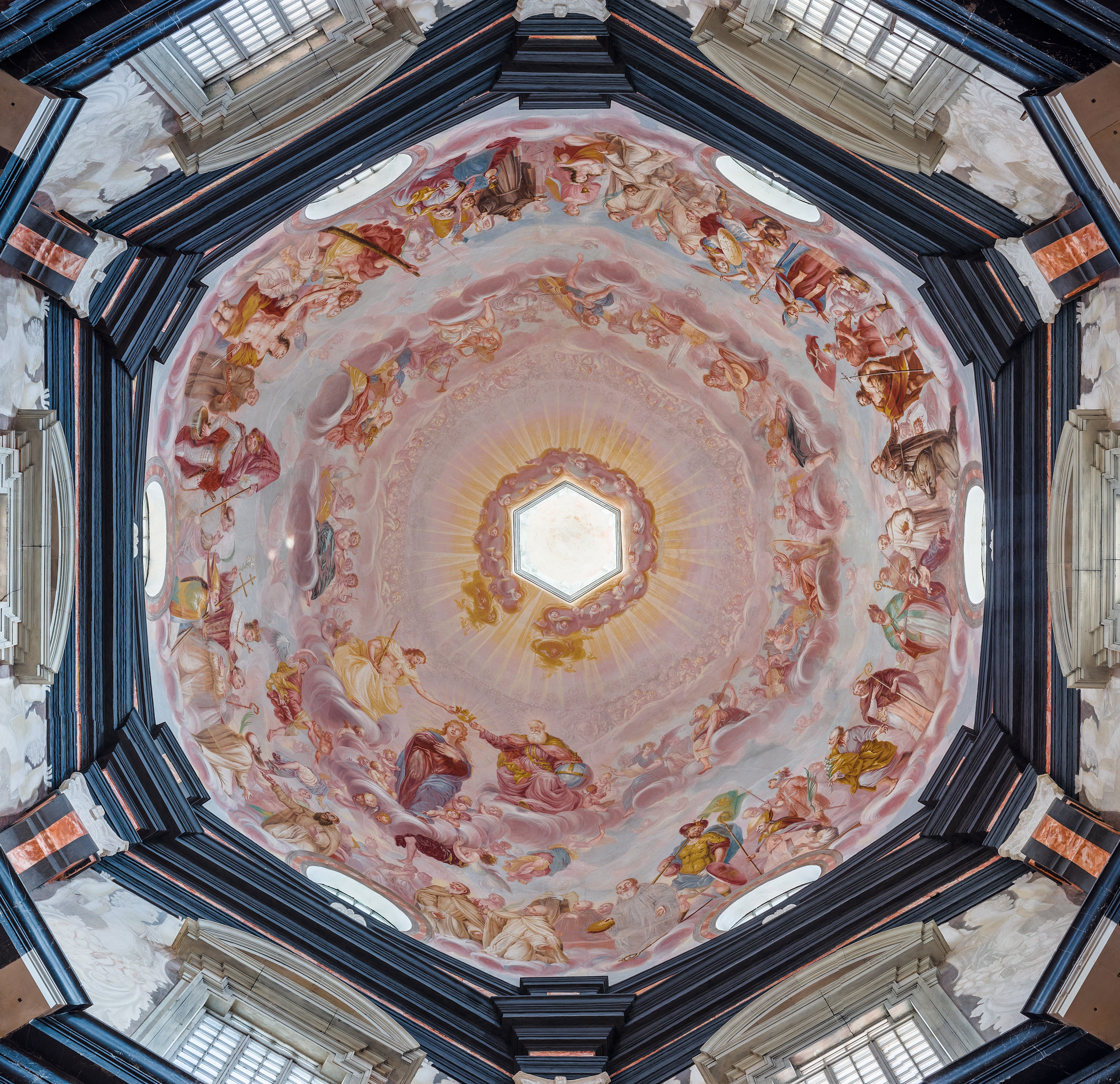
Dome and frescos inside the church

Founded in 1664 by nobleman of Grand Duchy of Lithuania and Grand Chancellor of Lithuania, Krzysztof Zygmunt Pac, as a hermitage for the Order of the Camaldolese on the hill called Mons Pacis in Latin (a hint to the Pac family; Literal translation: "Peace Mountain") on the estate bought from Oborski family that year. The main construction continued until 1674 and resumed in 1712.

The monastery was designed by Pietro Puttini, Carlo Puttini and Giovanni Battista Frediani. Exclusive architectural solutions were used for the first time in Lithuania: a hexagonal church plan, and a concave facade (both heavily influenced by Borromini who used a more elaborate and refined hexagonal plan and also a concave facade for Sant’Ivo alla Sapienza and also for Sant’ Agnese in Agone, both in Rome) interior stucco work is ascribed to Giovanni Maria Merli and the frescos to Michelangelo Palloni.

Krzysztof Zygmunt Pac burned the monastery construction bills before his death, saying, "What I have given to God, let him alone know." and was buried in the monastery according to his testament. Writers of the time wrote that the construction cost 8 barrels of gold coins.

In 1755 the addition of the towers and the dome was funded by the king's chamberlain Michał Jan Pac. The construction was completed in 1690, overseed by Michał Jan Pac.

The monastery's church, decorated with highly polished marble, was damaged by the horses of Napoleon's army which was based in the complex. In 1832 the monastery was closed by the Russian authorities and later converted into an Orthodox church. The author of the Imperial Russian national anthem God Save the Tsar, Alexei Lvov, was interred there in 1870.

In 1915–1918 when the Orthodox monks had fled a German war hospital was established in the monastery. The leaving Orthodox monks has stolen many treasures from the monastery, including the St. Mass Cup, decorated with over 1000 gemstones (over 400 diamonds, 300 rubies and 200 emeralds).

After 1920 the ruined monastery returned to Roman Catholics and was restored by sisters of the Lithuanian convent of St. Casimir. After World War II, the Soviet authorities converted the church and monastery into an archive, a psychiatric hospital and finally an art gallery (in 1966).

In 1990s the complex was returned by the newly independent Lithuania to the nuns of the convent and reconstruction work began.

The monastery has the painting of Mary Belle Mother and Child, revered by the congregation, two bells of the church and St. Romuald titles, cast in the seventeenth century and the oldest church clock tower in Lithuania.

== Music festival ==
Today the monastery is home to the annual international Pažaislis Music Festival. It was started in 1996 and now lasts for three summer months and offers about 30 different concerts.

The festival was visited by Yehudi Menuhin twice. It features classical music of diverse genres and styles, ranging from Wolfgang Amadeus Mozart to ABBA classics. Other concerts have taken place in many different venues across Lithuania, such as the Kaunas Castle, Klaipėda University, and even the Pociūnai Airport.

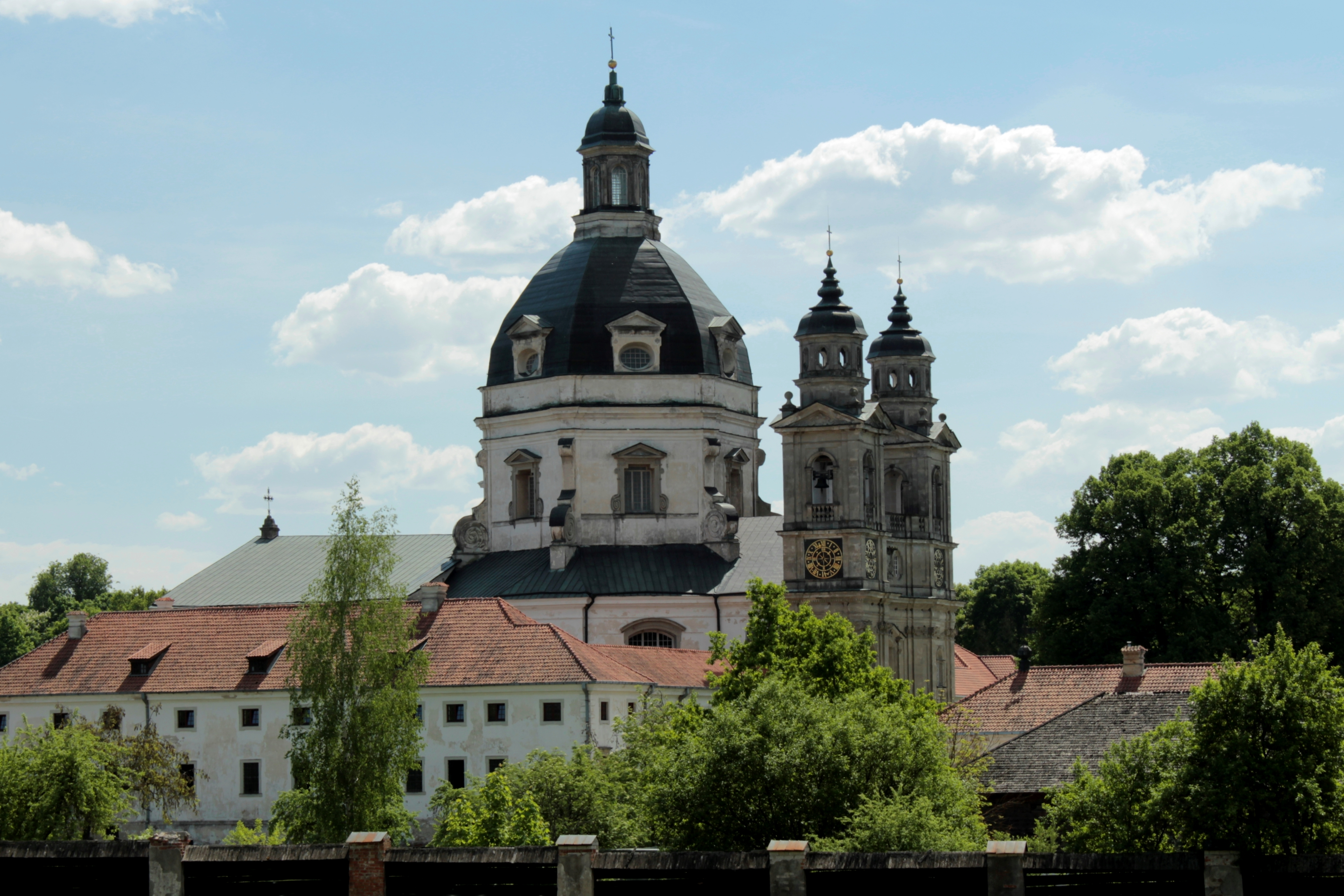
The dome of the church of the Visitation

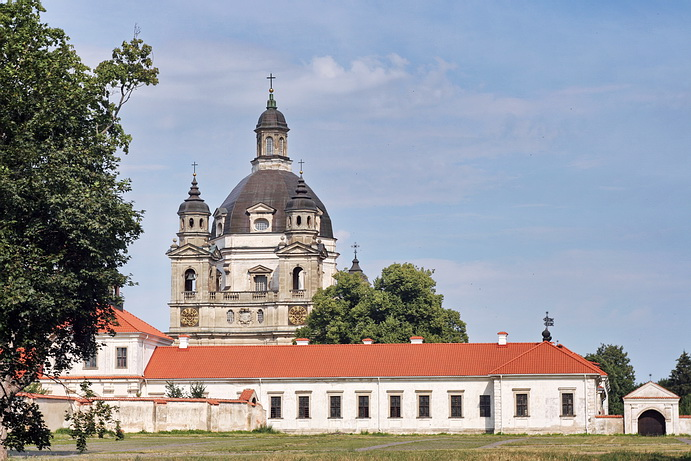
View of the ensemble from southwest

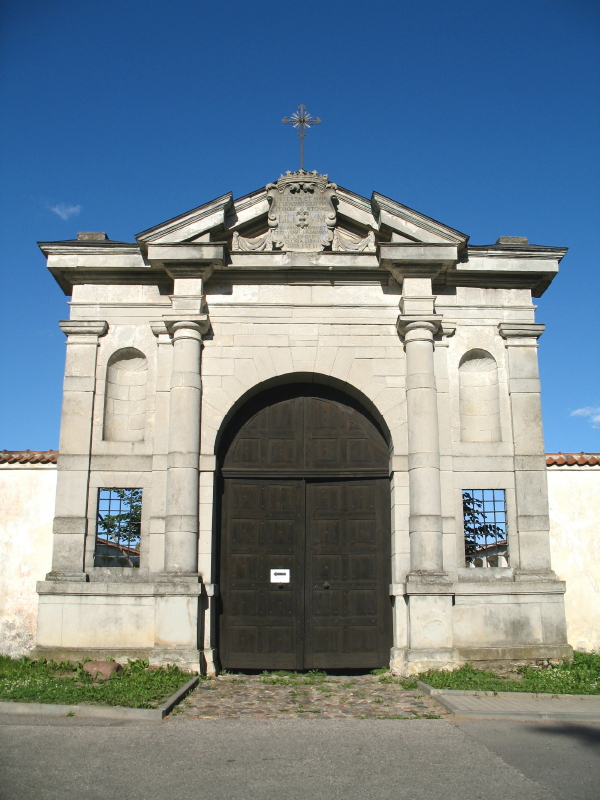
The Great Gates
