= Piotr Pac =

Polish-Lithuanian noble

Piotr Pac (Lithuanian: Petras Pacas) (after 1570–1642) was a Polish-Lithuanian noble, Lithuanian Court Chorąży from 1613, Lithuanian Court Treasurer from 1635, Voivode of Trakai (1640–1642).

He took part in the Battle of Kircholm in 1605. In 1607 he took part in the commission setting borders between the Polish–Lithuanian Commonwealth and Duchy of Courland.
