= List of Polish architects =

Following is a list of notable Polish architects and architects from Poland ordered by architectural period.

== Renaissance and Mannerism ==
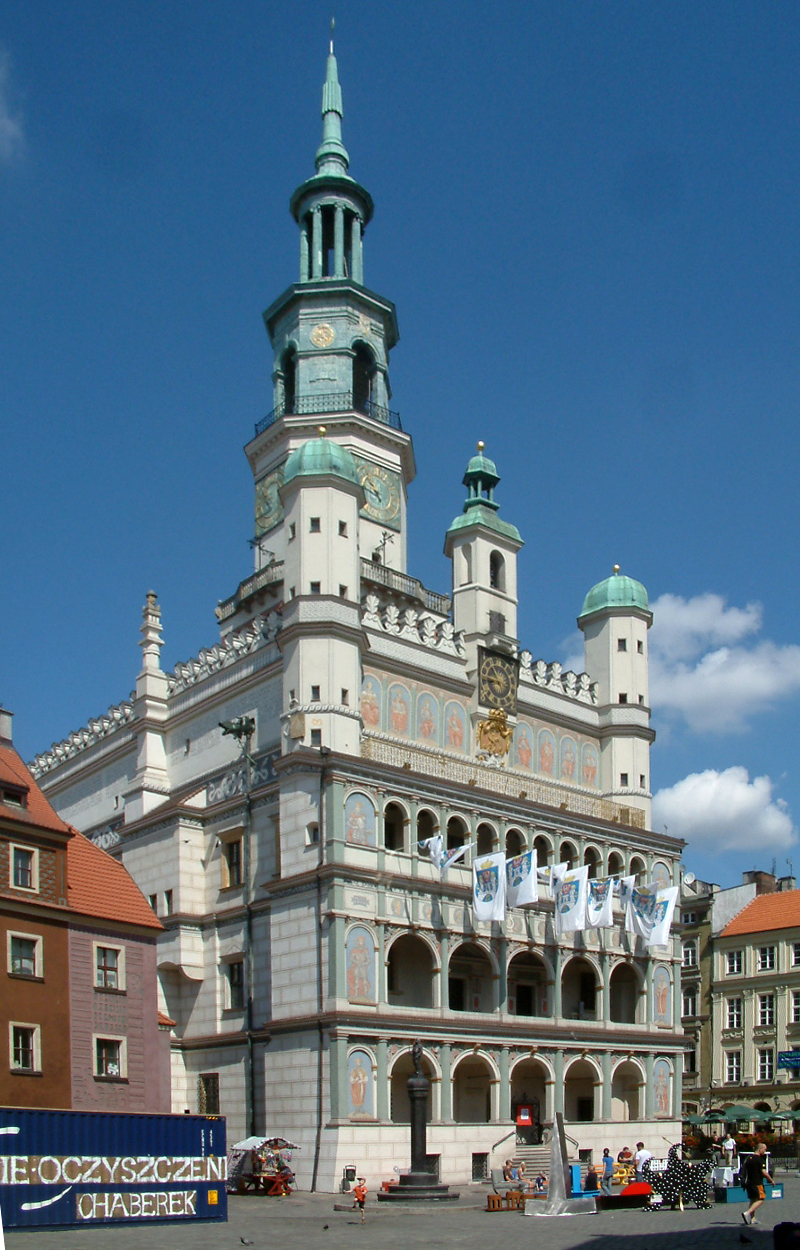
Giovanni Battista di Quadro: Poznań Town Hall

- Jakub Balin
- Bartolommeo Berrecci (Bartłomiej Berecci) (c. 1480–1537)
- Krzysztof Bonadura Starszy (1582–1670)
- Santi Gucci (c. 1530–1599)
- Jan Michałowicz (1530–1578)
- Bernardo Morando (c. 1540–1600)
- Giovanni Battista di Quadro (born 1590)
- Gabriel Słoński (1520–1598)
- Jan Strakowski (1567–1642)

== Baroque ==
- Krzysztof Arciszewski (1592–1656)
- Kacper Bażanka (c. 1689–1726)
- Piotr Beber
- Jan Frankiewicz
- Christof Marselis (1670s–1731)
- Bartłomiej Nataniel Wąsowski (1617–1687)
- Tylman van Gameren (1632–1706)
- Jan Zaor

== 18th century: Post Baroque, Rococo and Classical ==
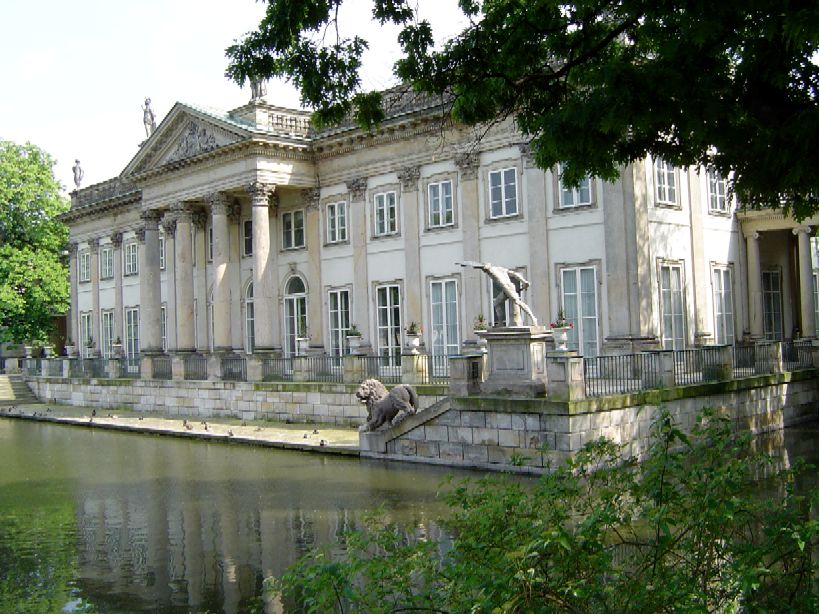
Dominik Merlini: Łazienki Palace in Łazienki Park, Warsaw

- Chrystian Piotr Aigner (1756–1841)
- Józef Boretti (1746–1849)
- Jakub Fontana (1710–1773)
- Paweł Giżycki (1692–1762)
- Jan Krzysztof Glaubitz (1700–1767)
- Faustyn Grodzicki
- Wawrzyniec Gucewicz (1753–1798)
- Jan Christian Kamsetzer (1753–1795)
- Józef Karsznicki
- Marcin Knackfus (ca. 1742–ca. 1821)
- Franciszek Koźmiński
- Jakub Kubicki (1758–1833)
- Fryderyk Albert Lessel (1767–1822)
- Andrzej Melenski (1766–1833)
- Dominik Merlini (1730–1797)
- Józef Feliks Rogaliński
- Antoni Solari
- Bonawentura Solari
- Efraim Szreger (1727–1783)
- Stanisław Zawadzki (1743–1806)
- Szymon Bogumił Zug (1733–1807)
- Tomasz Żebrowski (18th century)

== 19th century: Historicism and Eclecticism ==
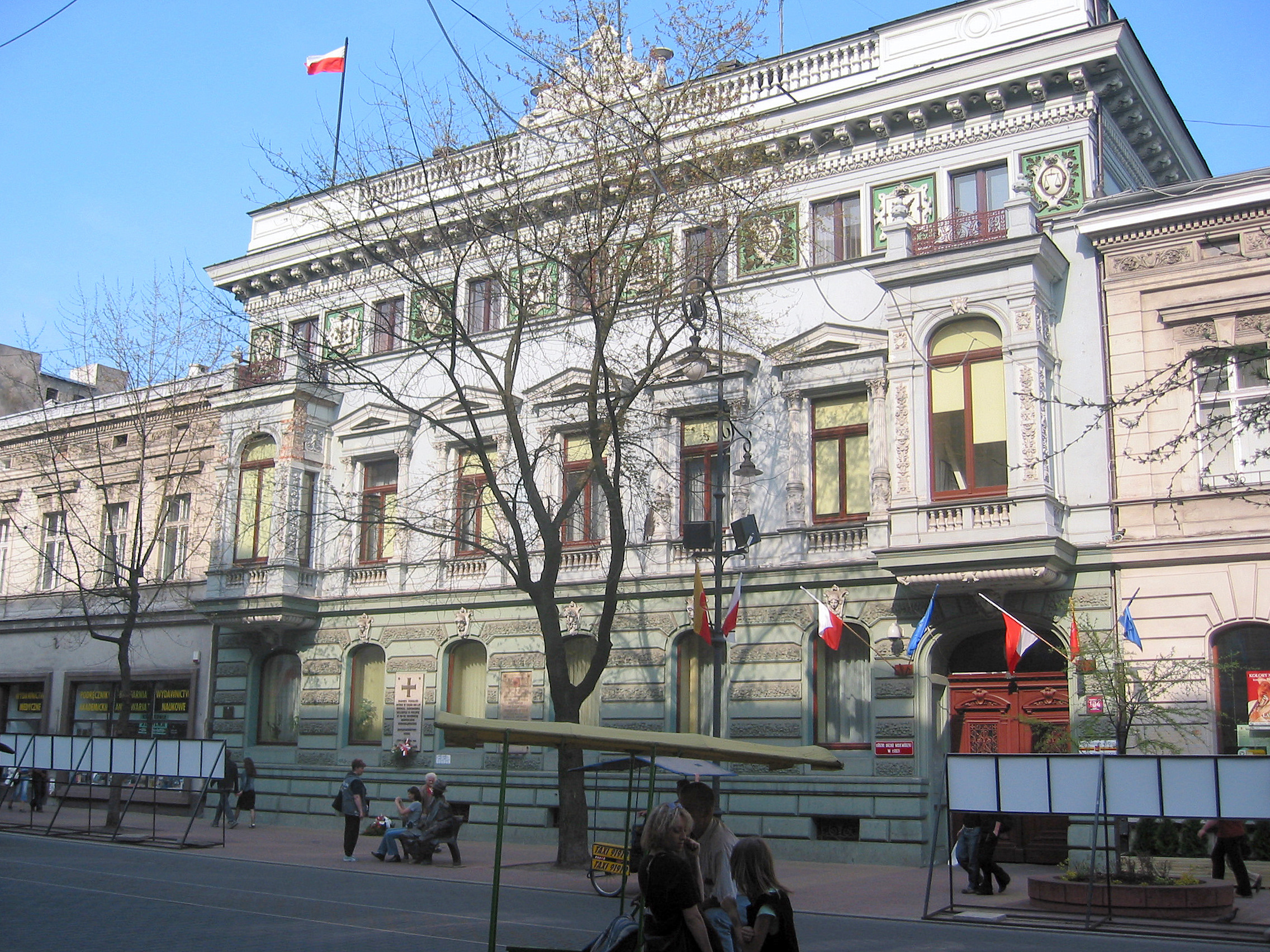
Hilary Majewski: Łódź City Hall, formerly Juliusz Heinzl Palace (Pałac Heinzla), in Łódź

- Julian Ankiewicz (1820–1903)
- Bronisław Brochwicz-Rogoyski (1861–1921)
- Franciszek Chełmiński (1862–1932)
- Edward Cichocki (1833–1899)
- Julian Cybulski
- Tomasz Bohdanowicz-Dworzecki (1859–1920)
- Józef Pius Dziekoński (1844–1927)
- Władysław Ekielski (1855–1927)
- Zygmunt Gorgolewski (1845–1903)
- Józef Gosławski (1865–1904)
- Stanisław Grochowicz
- Władysław Hirszel (1831–1889)
- Juliusz Hochberger
- Józef Huss (1846–1904)
- Józef Kajetan Janowski (1832–1914)
- Alfred Kamienobrodzki (1844–1922)
- Karol Knaus
- Feliks Księżalski (1820–1884)
- Gustaw Landau-Gutenteger (1879–1917)
- Dawid Lande (1868–1928)
- Józef Grzegorz Lessel (1802–1844)
- Wiesław Lisowski (1884–1954)
- Antoni Łuszkiewicz (1838–1886)
- Michał Łużecki (1868 – after 1939)
- Hilary Majewski (1838–1892)
- Karol Majewski (1824–1897)
- Enrico Marconi (1792–1863)
- Władysław Marconi (1848–1915)
- Franciszek Miechowicz (1786–1852)
- Maciej Moraczewski (1840–1928)
- Michael Novosielski – architect of the King's Theatre in London
- Sławomir Odrzywolski-Nałęcz (1846–1933)
- Józef Orłowski
- Tomasz Pajzderski (1864–1908)
- Józef Plośko
- Karol Podczaszyński (1790–1860)
- Bolesław Podczaszyński (1822–1876) – son of Karol Podczaszyński
- Filip Pokutyński (1829–1879)
- Tomasz Pryliński (1847–1895)
- Władysław Sadłowski (1869–1940)
- Franciszek Skowron
- Roger Sławski (1871–1963)
- Józef Sosnowski
- Stefan Szyller (1857–1933)
- Aleksander Szymkiewicz
- Hipolit Śliwiński (1866–1932)
- Leopold Śmieciński
- Teodor Talowski (1857–1910)
- Julian Zachariewicz (1837–1898)
- Jan Zawiejski (1854–1922)
- Adolf Zeligson
- Józef Sare (1850–1929)
- Karol Zaremba (1846–1897)
- Jan Sas Zubrzycki (1860–1935)
- Stefan Żołdani

== 20th century to present: Modern ==
=== A–B ===
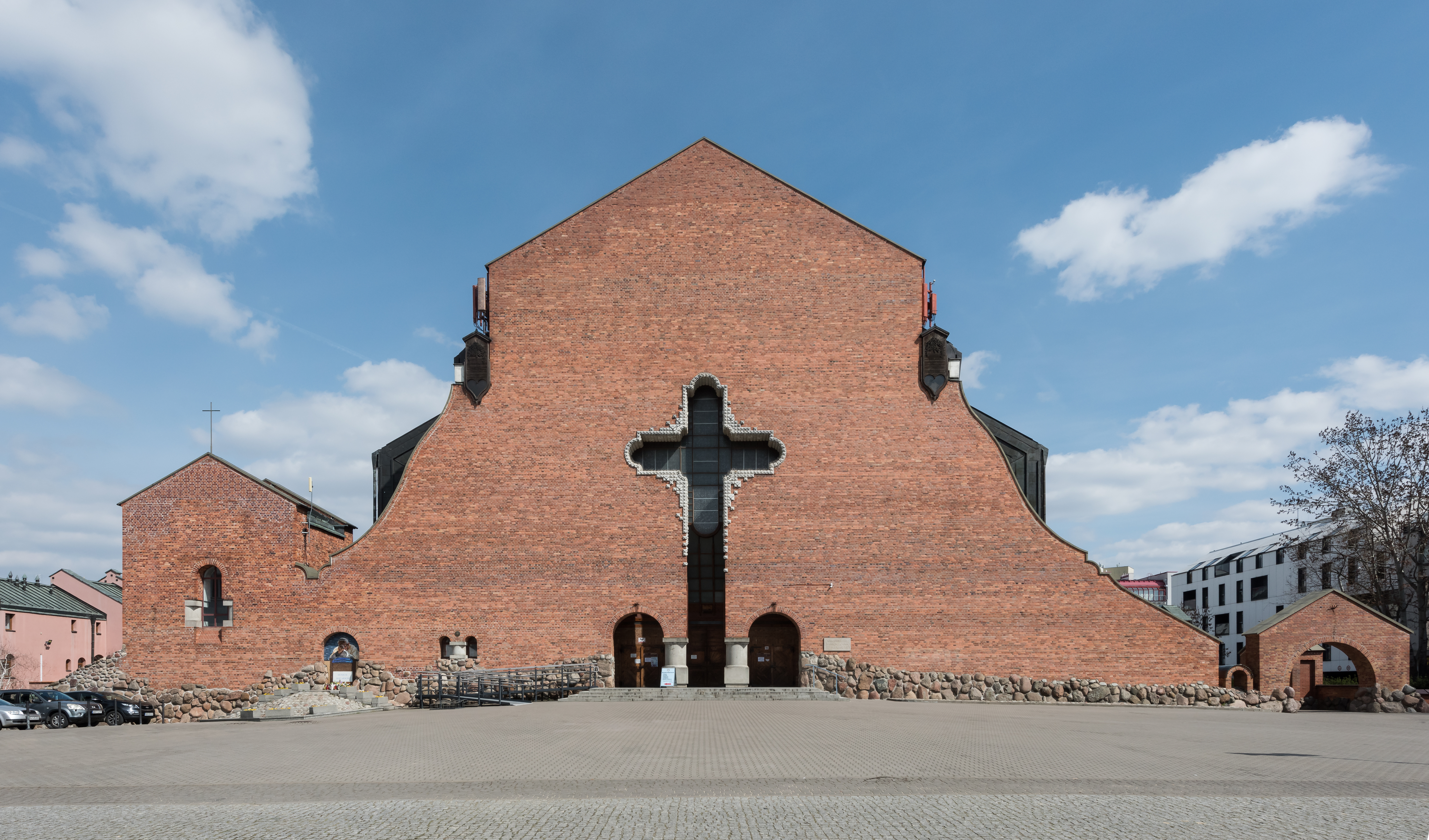
M. Budzyński: Church in Warsaw's district of Ursynów

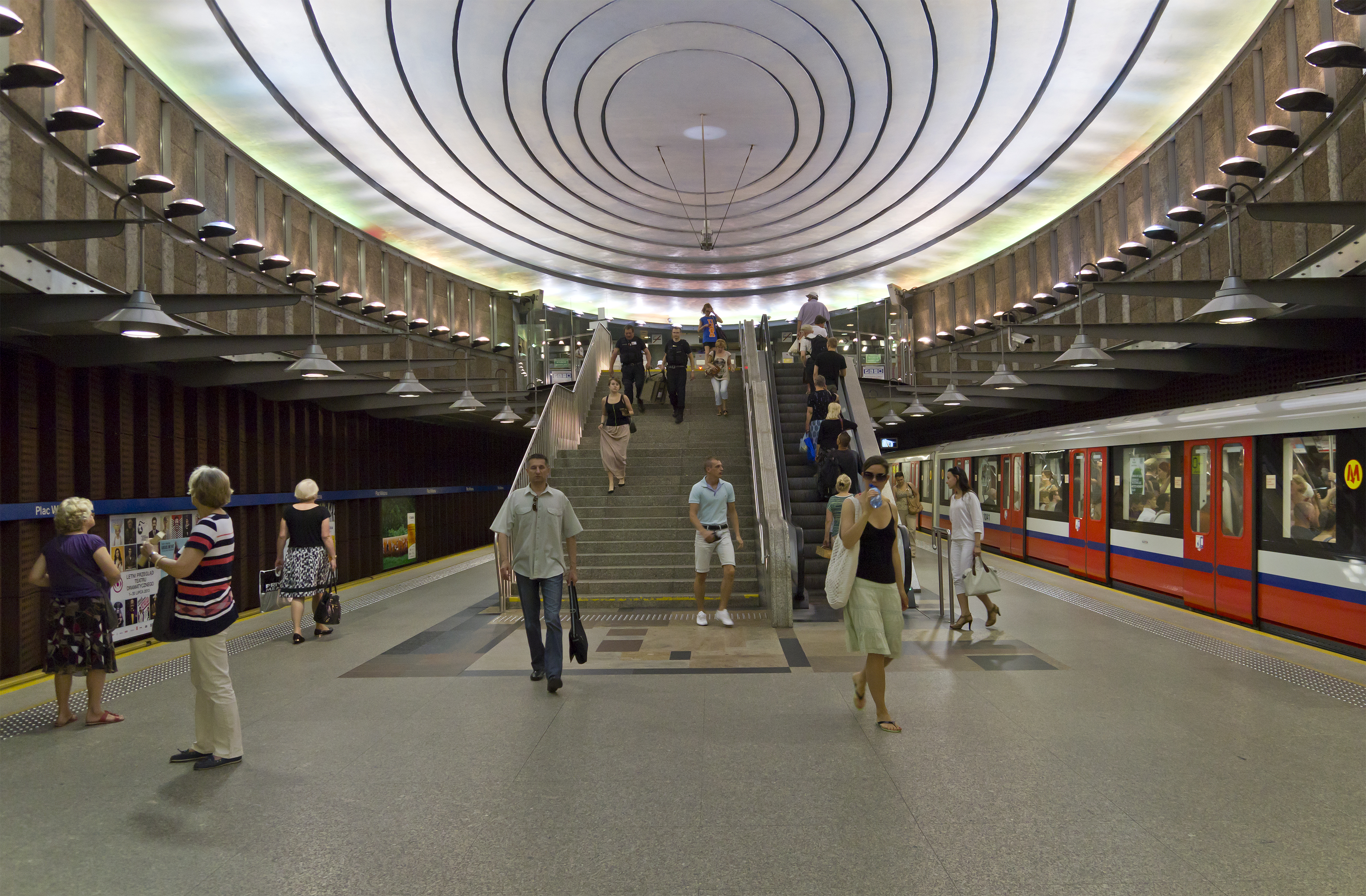
A. Chołdzyński: Plac Wilsona metro station of the Warsaw Metro

- Hanna Adamczewska-Wejchert (1920-1996)
- Stanisław Adamski (1875-1967)
- Roman Bandurski (1874–1949)
- Lotte Beese (1903-1988)
- Barbara Brukalska (1899-1980)
- Stefan Bryła (1886–1943)

=== C–D ===
- Adolf Ciborowski (1918–1987)
- Jan Cieśliński (1899–1967)
- Gerard Ciołek (1909-1966)
- Józef Czajkowski (1872-1947)
- Władysław Derdacki (1882–1951)

=== E–F ===
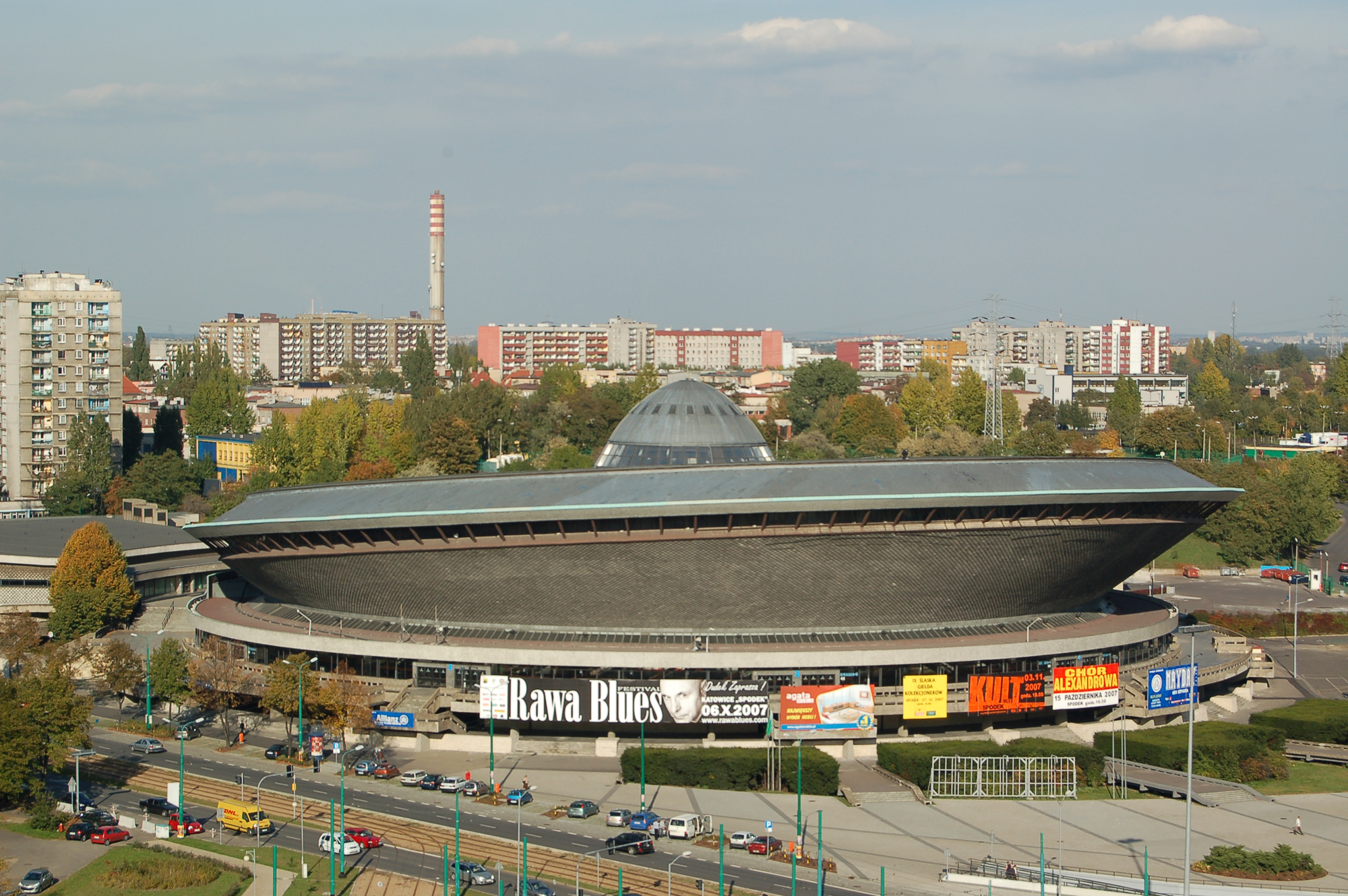
Maciej Gintowt: Spodek arena in Katowice

- Roman Feliński (1886-1953)
- Stanisław Fiszer (1769-1812)

=== G–I ===
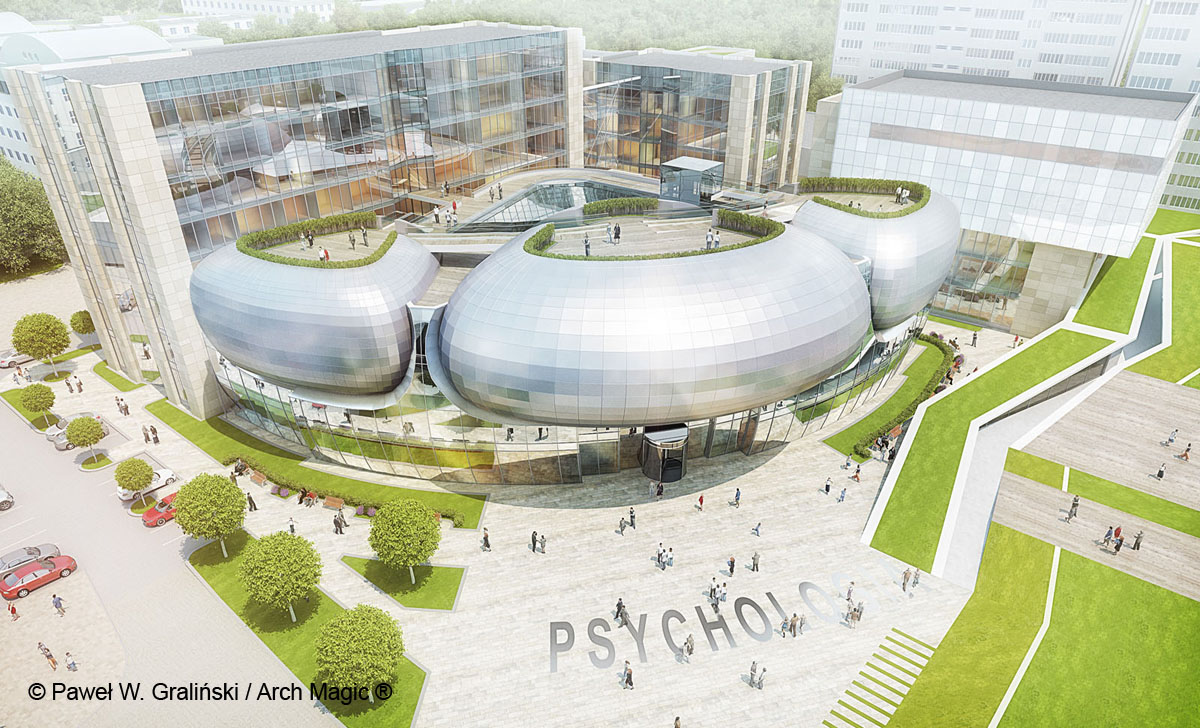
Paweł Graliński: Faculty of Psychology, University of Warsaw

- Zofia Garlińska-Hansen (1924–2013)
- Henryk Julian Gay (Henryk Gaj) (1875–1936)
- Vladislav Gorodetsky (born Leszek Dezydery Władysław Horodecki)(1863–1930)
- Jadwiga Grabowska-Hawrylak (1920–2018)
- Paweł Graliński (born 1961)
- Stanisław Hempel (1892–1954)
- Jerzy Hryniewiecki (1909–1988)

=== J–K ===
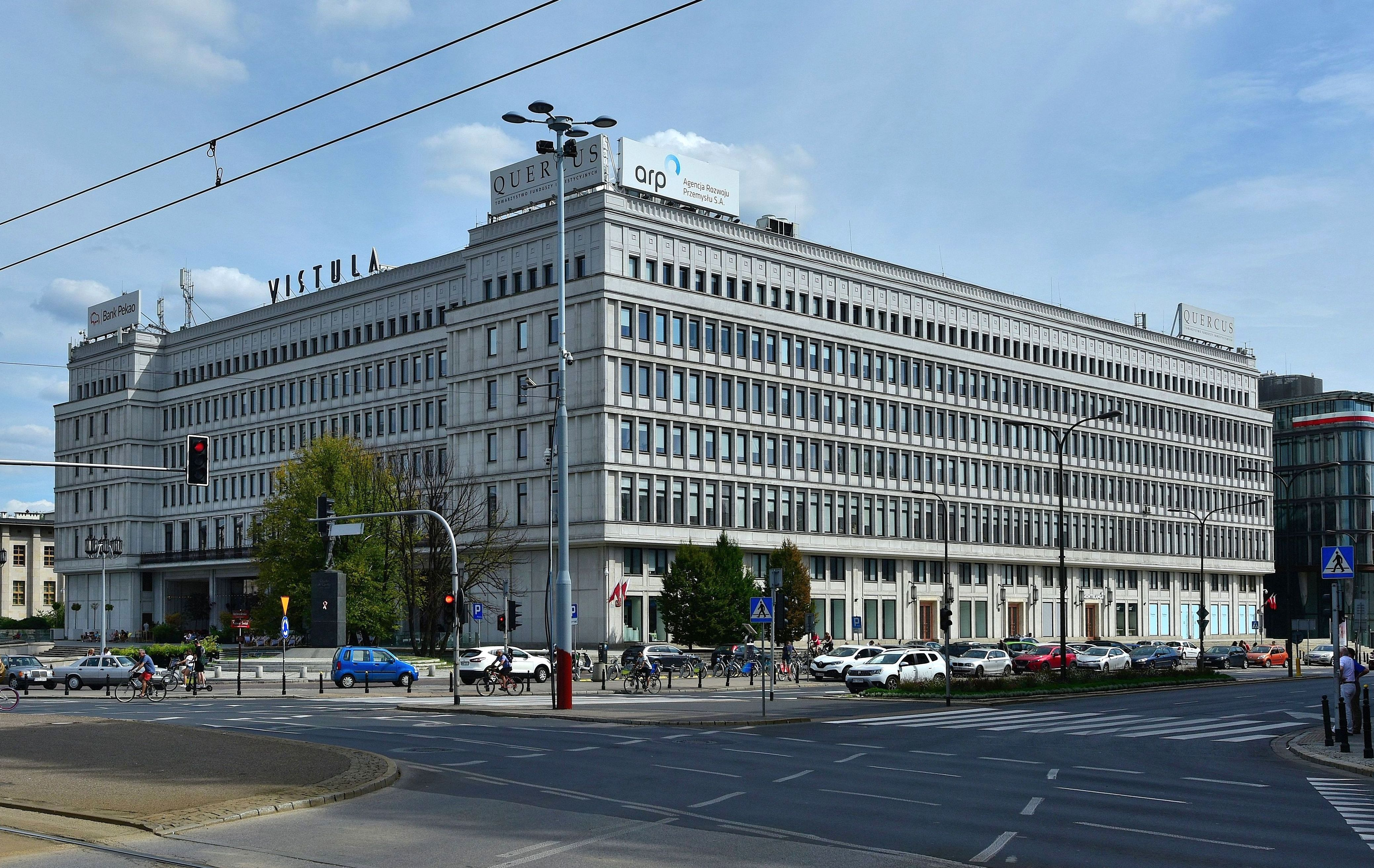
W. Kłyszewski, J. Mokrzyński, E. Wierzbicki: Building of the KC PZPR (Polish United Workers' Party) in Warsaw

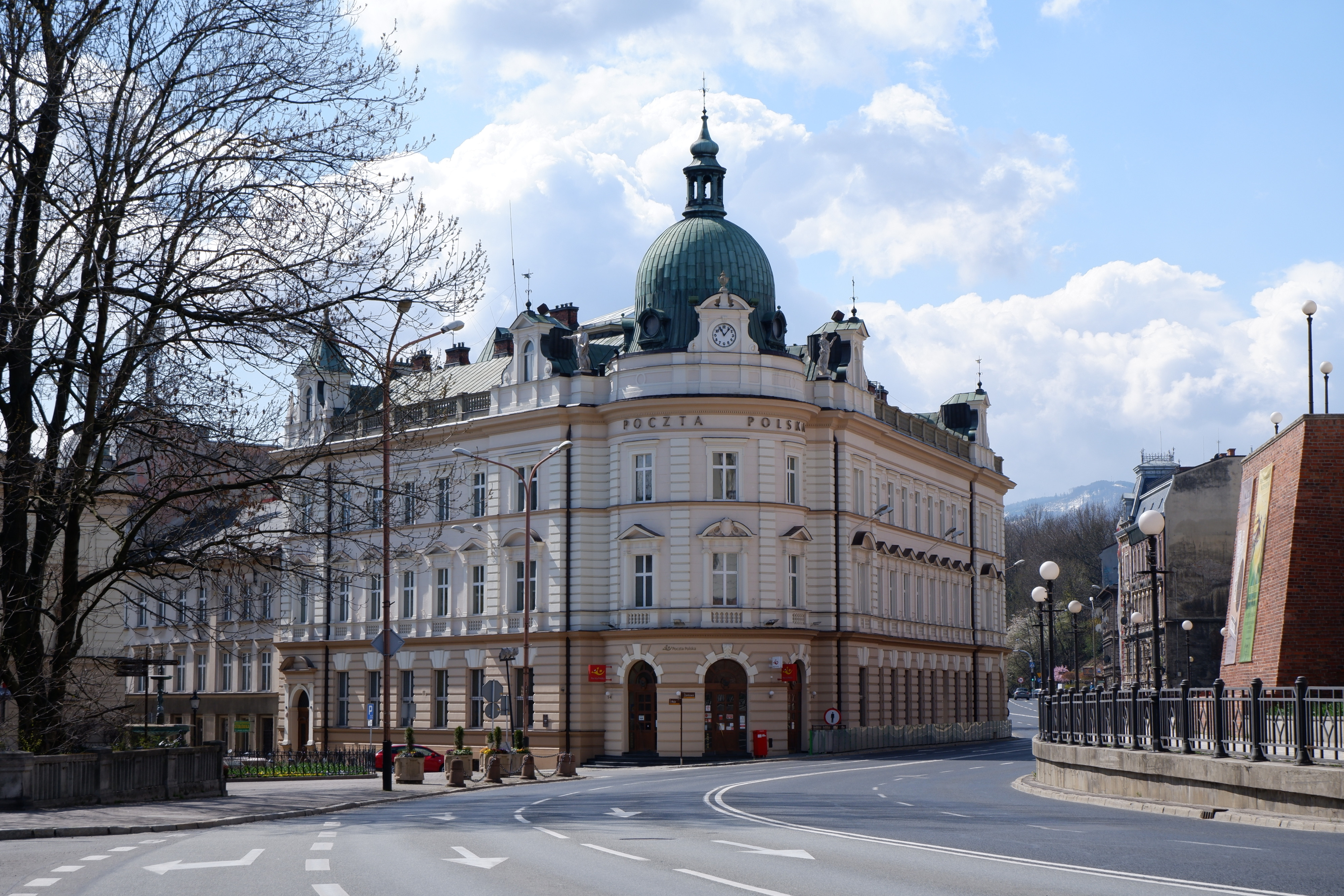
C. Korn: The main post office in Bielsko-Biała

- Stanisław Jankowski (1911-2002)
- Ryszard Jurkowski (born 1945)
- Ignacy Kędzierski (1877–1968)
- Zygmunt Kędzierski (1839–1924)
- Jacek Krenz (born 1948)
- Bogdan Krzyżanowski
- Stefan Kuryłowicz (1949–2011)

=== L–M ===
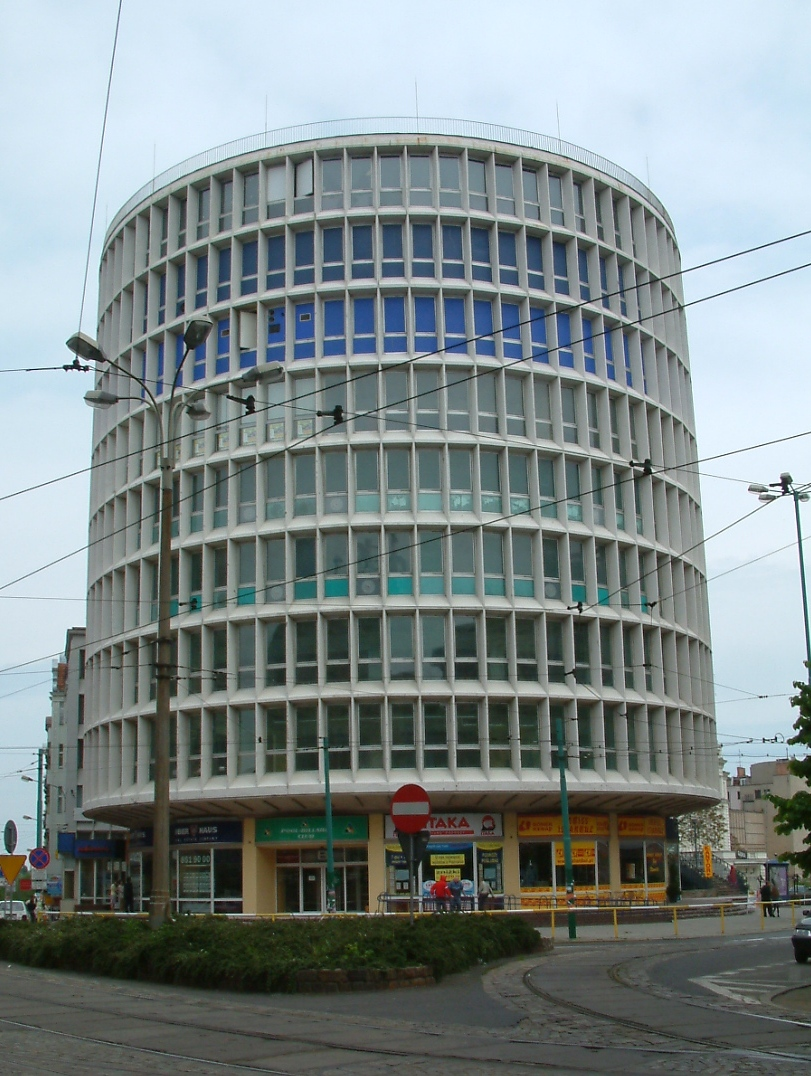
M. Leykam: DT "Orąglak" in Poznań

- Bohdan Lachert (1900–1987)
- Zbigniew Brochwicz-Lewiński (1877–1951)
- Józef Masłowski (1931-2020)
- Franciszek Mączyński (1874–1947)
- Witold Minkiewicz (1880–1961)
- Kazimierz Mokłowski (1869-1905)

=== N–O ===
- Maciej Nowicki (1910–1950)
- Tadeusz Obmiński (1874–1932)

=== P–Q ===
- Sylwester Pajzderski (1876–1953)
- Bohdan Pniewski (1897–1965)
- Włodzimierz Podhorodecki (1859-1923)
- Juliusz Prandecki (1928-2016)
- Georg Przyrembel (1885–1956)
- Julian Puterman-Sadłowski (1892–1953)

=== R–S ===
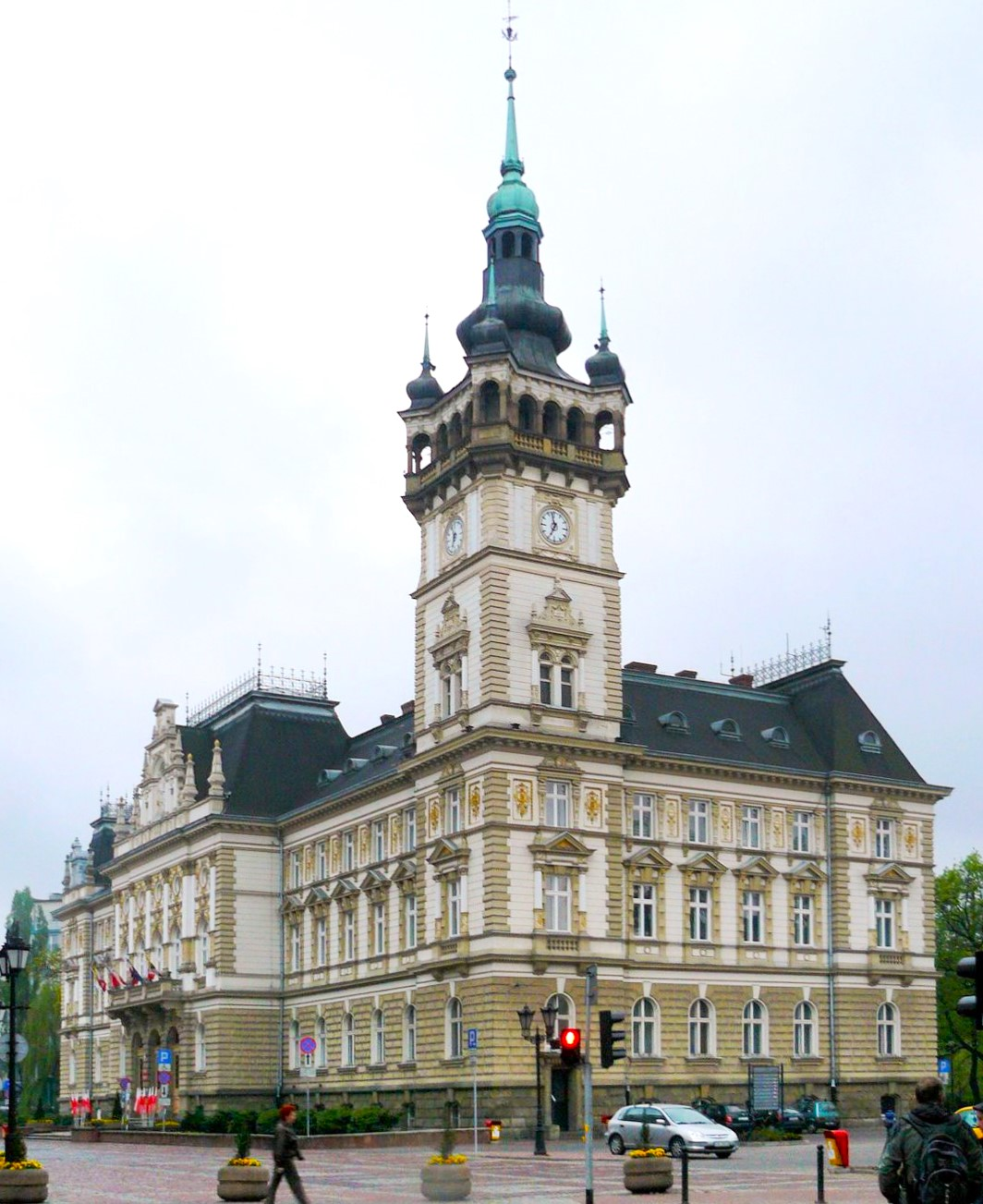
Emanuel Rost: Town Hall in Bielsko-Biała

- Wincenty Rawski (1850-1927)
- Stanisław Ryniak (1915–2004)
- Halina Skibniewska (1921-2011)
- Roger Sławski (1871–1963)
- Jerzy Sołtan (1913–2005)
- Oskar Sosnowski (1880-1939)
- Tadeusz Stryjeński (1849–1943)
- Szymon Syrkus (1893–1964)
- Helena Syrkus (1900–1982)
- Józef Szanajca (1902-1939)
- Witold Szolginia (1923–1996)
- Adolf Szyszko-Bohusz (1883–1948)

=== T–U ===
- Czesław Thullie (1886–1976)
- Michał Ulam (1879–1938)
- Kazimierz Ulatowski (1884–1975)
- Tomasz Urbanowicz (born 1959)

=== V–Z ===
- Jan Koszczyc-Witkiewicz (1881–1958)
- Kazimierz Wyczyński (1876-1923)
- Wojciech Zabłocki (1930–2020)
- Alfred Zachariewicz (1871-1937)
- Jan Zachwatowicz (1900–1983)
- Stanisław Żaryn (1913–1964), architect and monument conservator
- Zbigniew Zieliński (1907–1968)
- Wiktor Zin (1925–2007)
- Juliusz Żórawski (1898-1967)

== See also ==
- Architecture of Poland
- List of architects
- List of Poles
