= Zaur =

Zaur is a given name. Notable people with the name include:

- Zaur Ardzinba (1950–2015), businessman from Abkhazia who unsuccessfully ran for president in the 2009 election
- Zaur Gashimov (born 1981), Azerbaijani football defender
- Zaur Gurbanli (born 1987), youth activist, co-founder and ex-board member of N!DA Civic Movement
- Zaur Hashimov (born 1981), football defender from Azerbaijan
- Zaur Kaloev (1931–1997), Georgian footballer
- Zaur Kaziev (1983–2024), Russian footballer
- Zaur Khapov (born 1964), retired football goalkeeper who won two international caps for Russia in 1994
- Zaur Kuramagomedov (born 1988), Avar–Balkar wrestler who won a bronze medal at the 2012 Summer Olympics
- Zaur Mamutov (born 1980), Ukrainian–Russian football player
- Zaur Pachulia (born 1984), Georgian professional basketball player
- Zaur Pashayev (born 1982), Azerbaijani judoka
- Qari Zaur Rahman, citizen of Afghanistan reported to be a leader of the Taliban's leadership
- Zaur Ramazanov (born 1976), Azerbaijani football striker
- Zaur Sadayev (born 1989), Russian football player of Chechen origin
- Zaur Tagizade (born 1979), retired Azerbaijani footballer
- Zaur Tedeyev (born 1981), Russian professional football coach and a former player

== Fictional characters ==
- Protagonists from
  - Abrek Zaur, Soviet early silent adventure film
  - Artush and Zaur, novel by Azerbaijani writer and journalist Ali Akbar (alias of Alakbar Aliyev) published in 2009

== See also ==
- Zaur or Zaurovo, a historical Ingush village on the right bank of Terek river
- Jan Zaur or Jan Zaor, Polish baroque architect from Kraków who was active from 1638 to 1676
- Zarur (disambiguation)
