= Kaziev =

Kaziev (Russian: Казиев) is a Russian surname. Notable people with the surname include:

- Shapi Kaziev (1956–2020), Soviet and Russian writer, playwright, and script writer
- Zaur Kaziev (1983–2024), Russian footballer
