= Władysław Derdacki =

Polish architect (1882–1951)

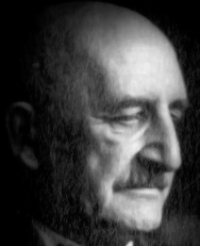
- Born: 30 March 1882; Sokal, Kingdom of Galicia and Lodomeria, Austria-Hungary
- Died: 10 November 1951 (aged 69); Gliwice, Polish People's Republic
- Occupation: architect
- Practice: Lviv Polytechnic
- Buildings: Galician Credit Bank in Lviv; Pedagogical Society House in Lviv

Władysław Dominik Derdacki (born 30 March 1882, Sokal – died 10 November 1951, Gliwice) was a Polish architect active mainly in the city of Lviv and towns and cities of the Kingdom of Galicia and Lodomeria.

== Life and work ==
In 1900, he graduated from secondary school and began to study at the Lviv Polytechnic at the Faculty of Engineering. After one year, he changed the subject and pursued studies at the Faculty of Architecture, which he graduated from with honours in 1907. Since 1907, he worked at the architectural company of Jan Levinsky where, together with Witold Minkiewicz, they created a number of projects. In 1911, Derdacki and Minkiewicz established their own architectural company. He was a member of the "Zespół" Architecture Association as well as the Polish Polytechnic Society in Lviv (Polskie Towarzystwo Politechniczne we Lwowie). In 1914, he was appointed a member of the examination board of the Faculty of Architecture of the Lviv Polytechnic. In 1924, he was awarded the title of a professor. In 1922-1923 and 1927-1930 he served as dean of the Faculty of Architecture.

In 1946, after the postwar population transfers, he settled in Gliwice where he worked as Head of the Department of Civil Engineering at the Silesian University. He engaged in an active academic work, researching efficient dwelling houses planning and published numerous architecture-related articles in professional journals.

== Selected works ==
- In Jan Levinsky's company:
  - A complex of tenement houses on Leon Sapieha Street in Lviv (currently Stepan Bandera Street 2-4-6), 1909
  - Tenement house at St. Nicholas Street in Lviv (currently Mykhailo Hrushevsky Street 10), 1910
  - Tenement house on Casimir Pulaski Street in Lviv (currently Parkowa Street 14), 1910
- In partnership with Minkiewicz:
  - Pedagogical Society House on Chorążczyna Street in Lviv (currently Dzhokhar Dudayev Street 17), 1911
  - Tenement House on Snopkowska Street in Lviv (currently Vasyl Stus Street 5/7), 1912
  - Tenement House at Wałowa Street 13 in Lviv, 1912
  - Tenement house on John III Sobieski Street in Lviv (currently Rohatyniets Brothers' Street 14), 1912
  - Galician Credit Bank on Wały Hetmańskie Avenue (currently Prospect Svobody 17), 1911-1912
  - Villa on Jan Tarnowski Street in Lviv (currently Myron Tarnavsky Street 71), 1913-1922
  - Project of the new seat of the Faculty of Mechanics on Kornel Ujejski Street in Lviv (currently Mykola Ustynanovich Street), 1913, the construction of the building was carried out according to Witold Minkiewicz's project in 1924
  - Competition project of St. Anne's Church (2nd place)
- In collaboration with other architects:
  - The "Falcon" Polish Gymnastic Society House in Husiatyn, Busk and Skalat
  - First prize for the project of the seat of Towarzystwo Ziemskie in Przemyśl, 1912
  - First prize for the project of the seat of the city council in Berezhany, 1912
  - Project of the interior design of the Kraków Hotel in Lviv, 1914
  - Functionalist villa at Cetnerówka Street 18 in Lviv
  - Krzyżewskis' Villa on Żyżyńsks Street in Lviv (currently Volodymyr Kubiyovych Street 41), 1925
  - Building of the Ukrainian Catholic University in Lviv, 1924-1926

== Gallery ==
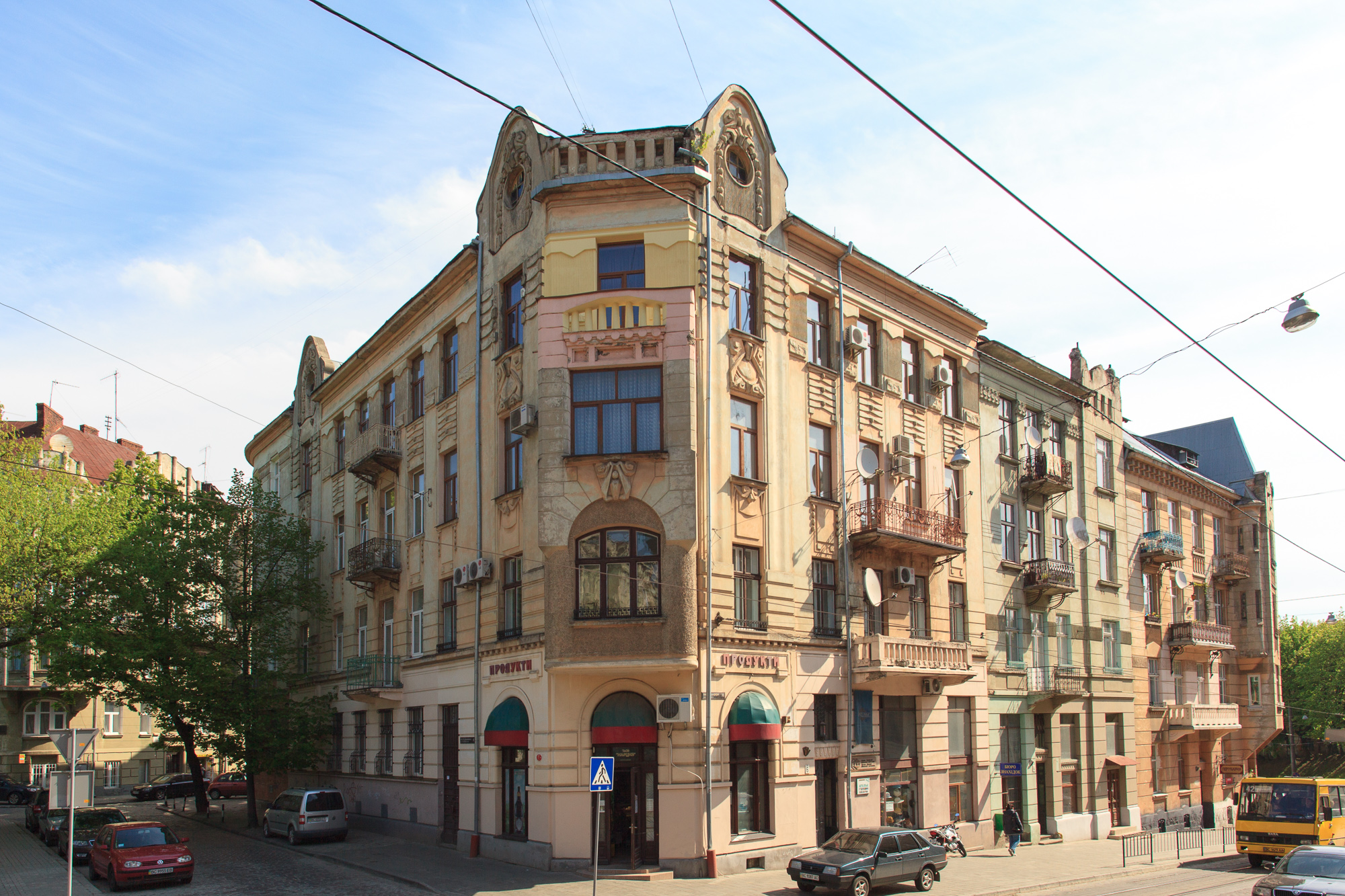
Tenement at 6 Bandery St

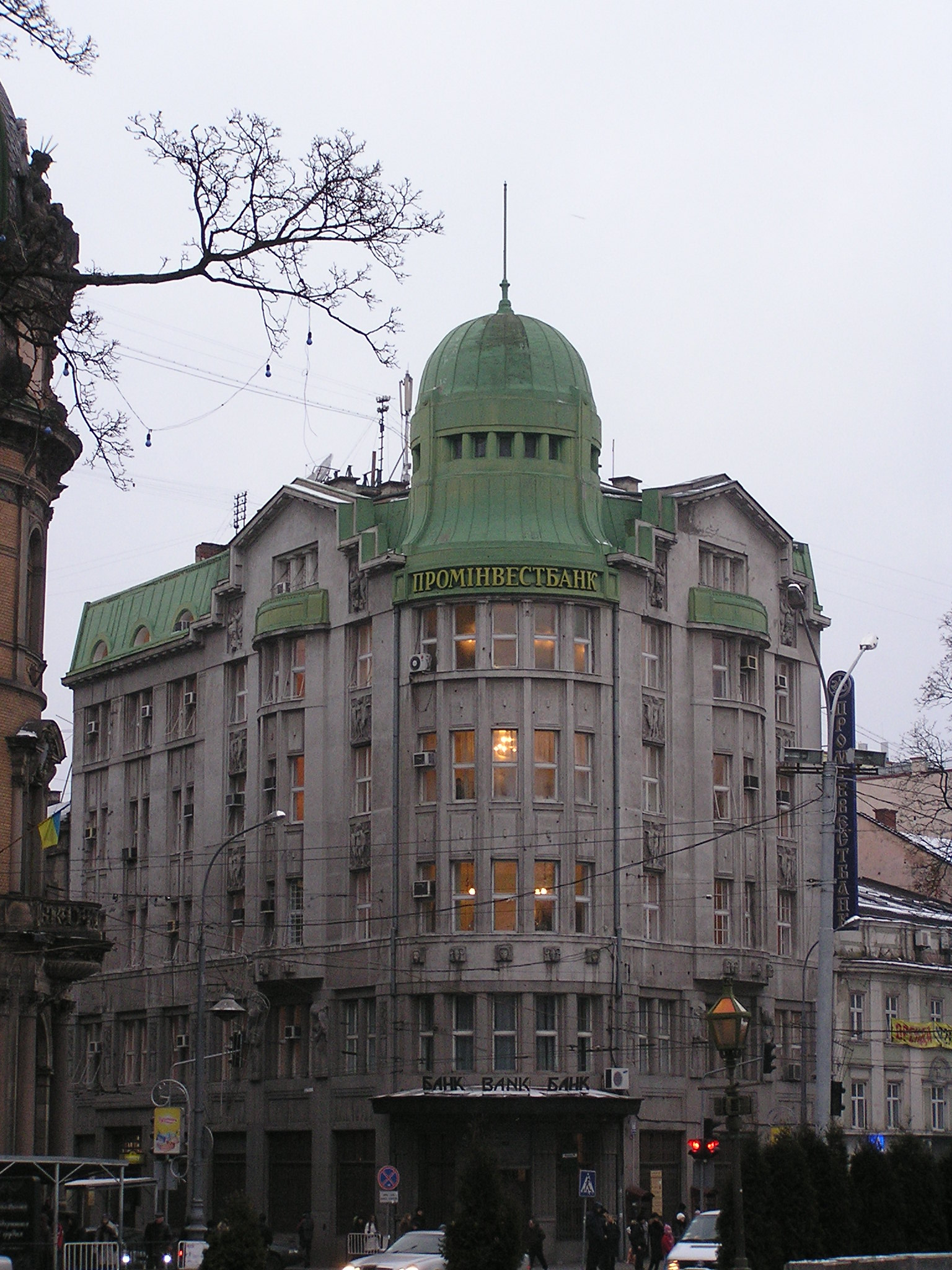
Galician Credit Bank in Lviv (1911-1912)

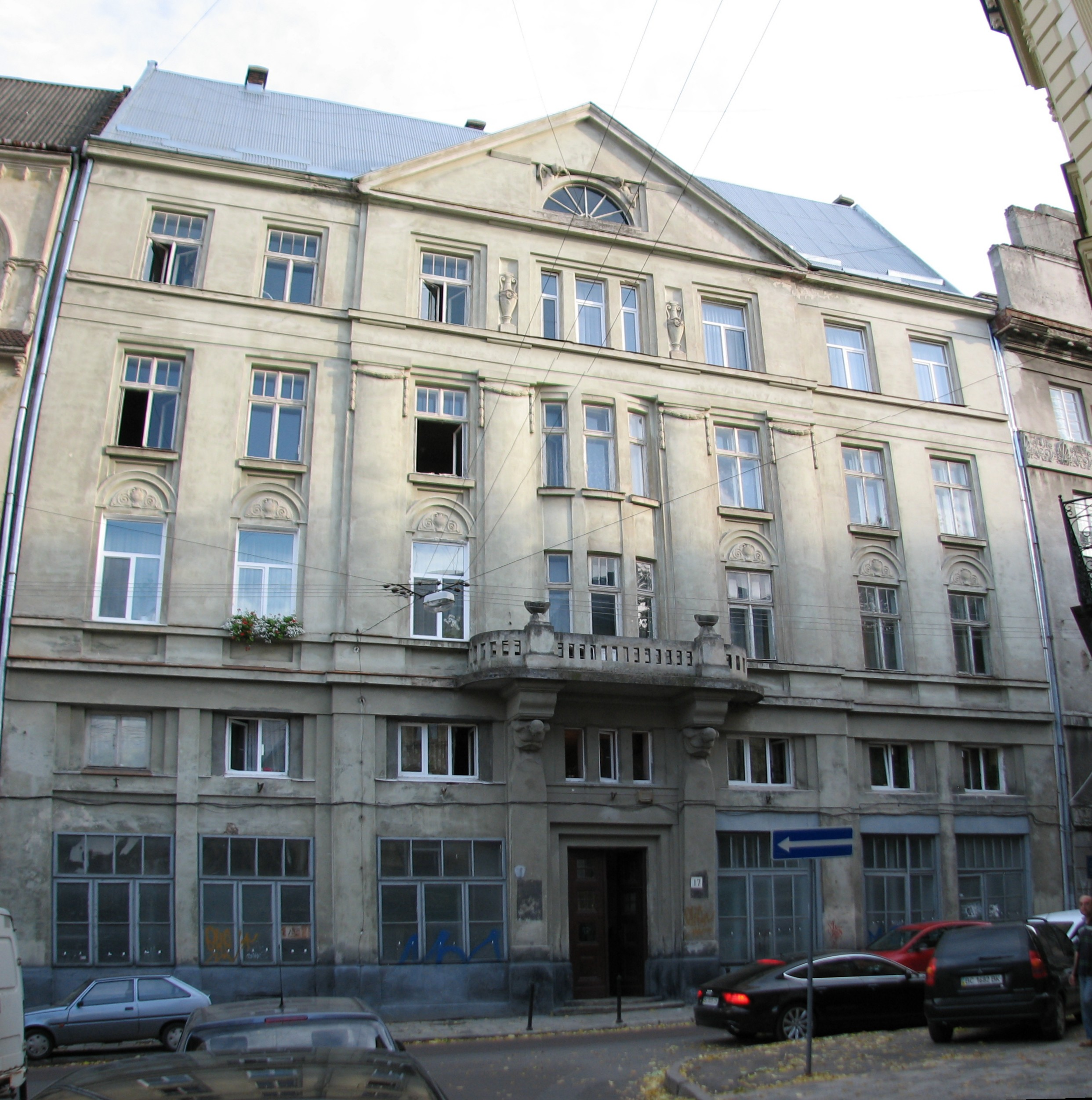
Pedagogical Society House in Lviv

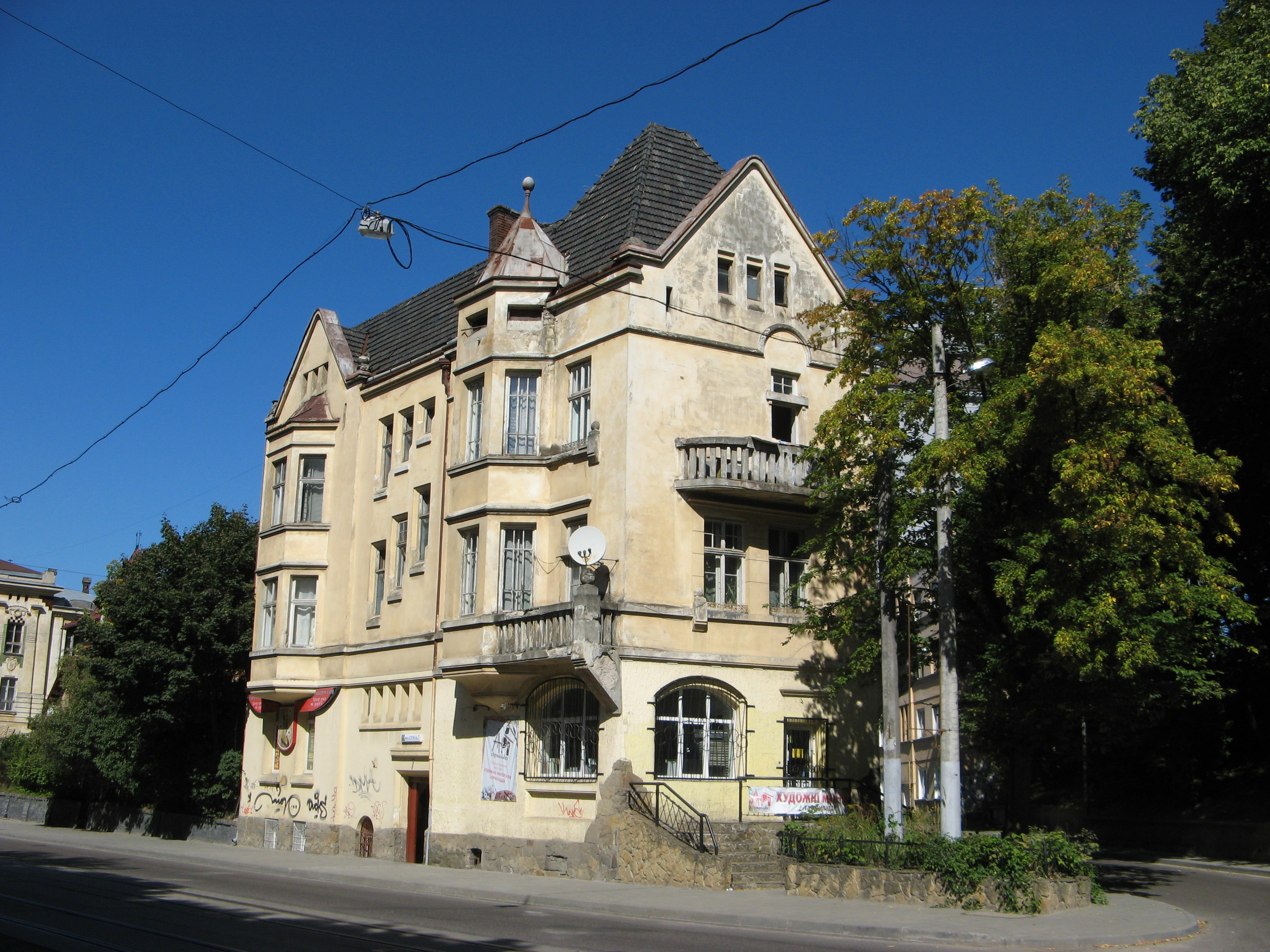
Tenement house at Stusa Street 7, Lviv

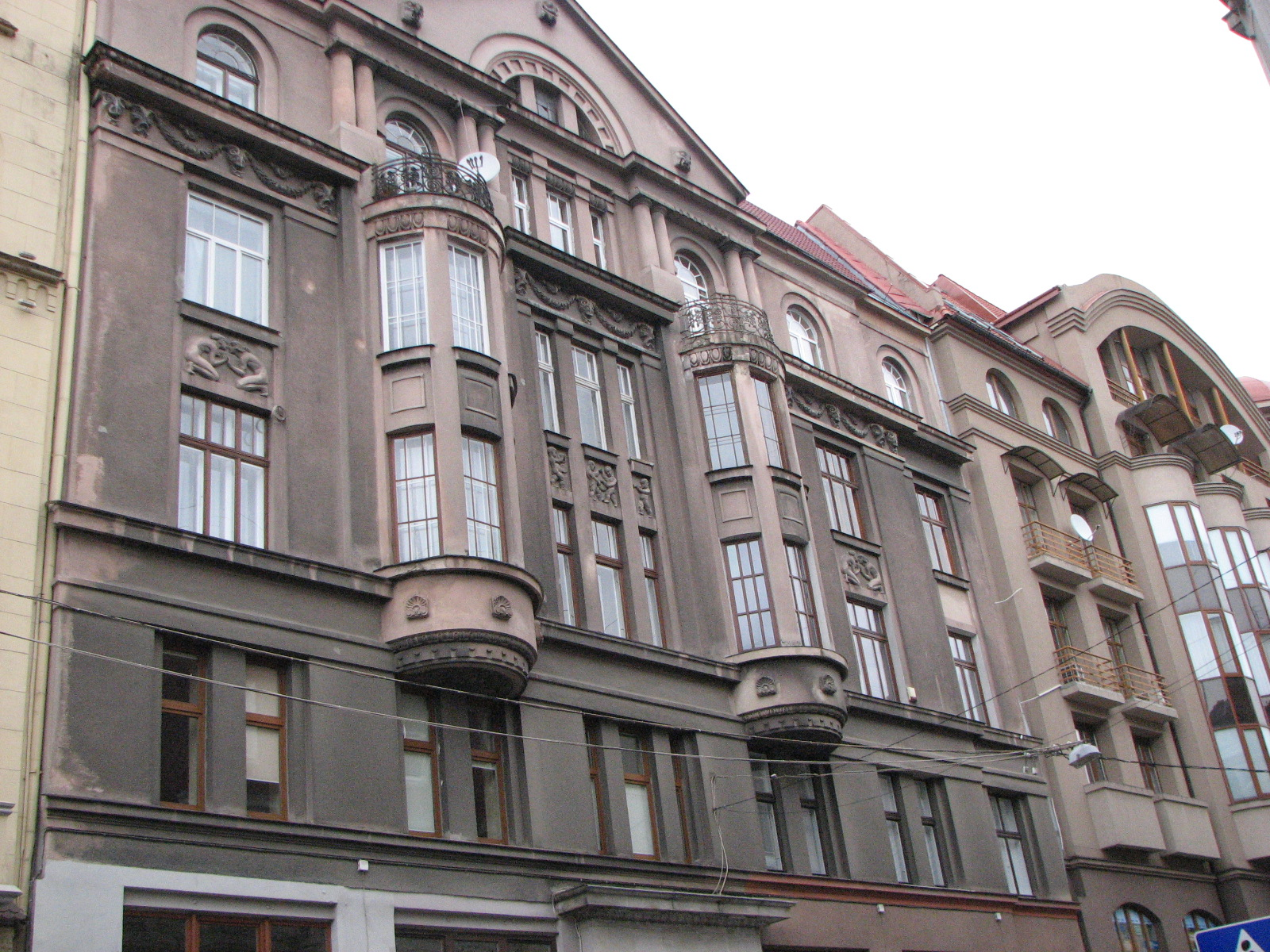
Tenement house at Wałowa Street 13, Lviv

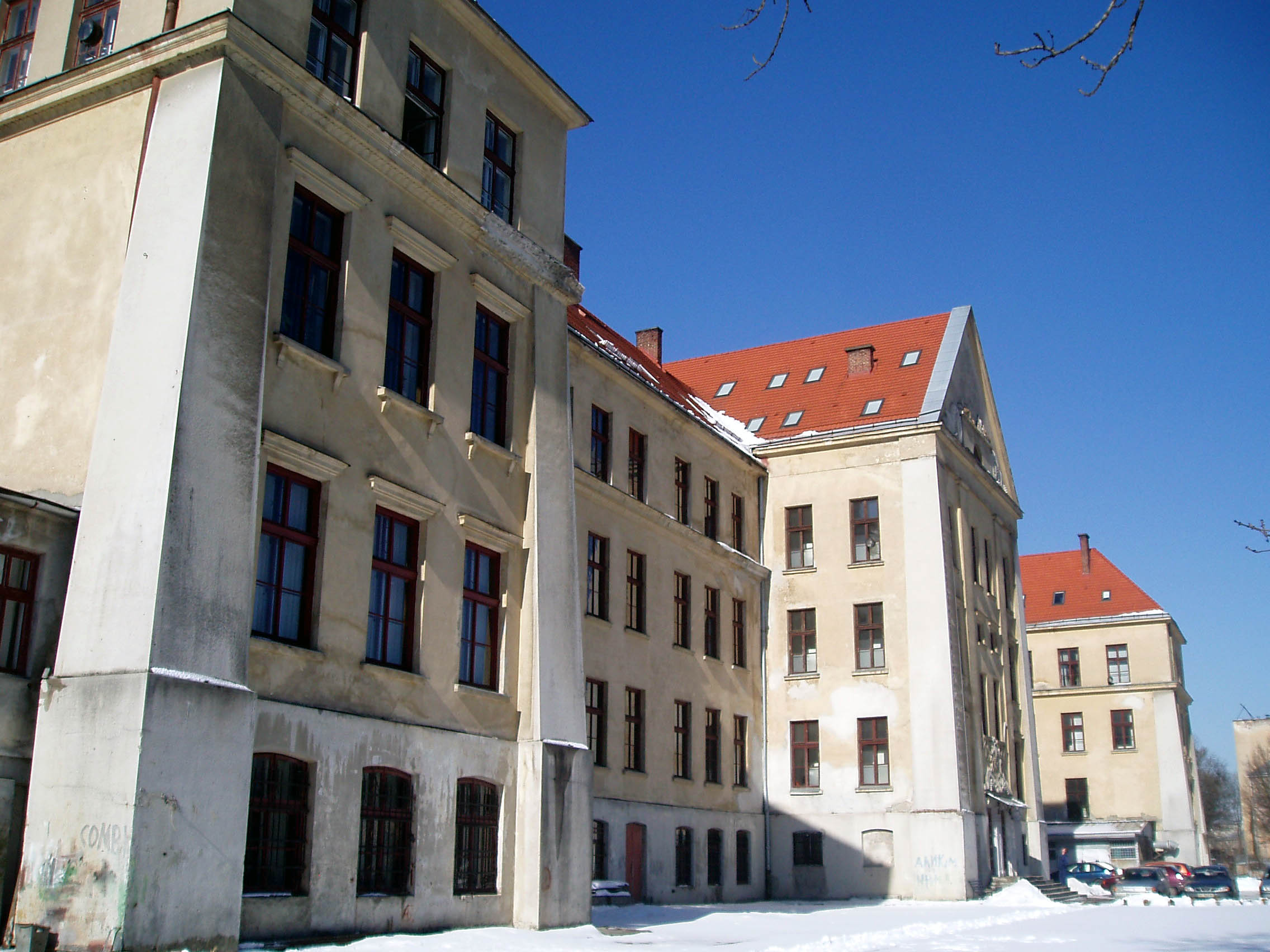
Ukrainian Catholic University, Lviv

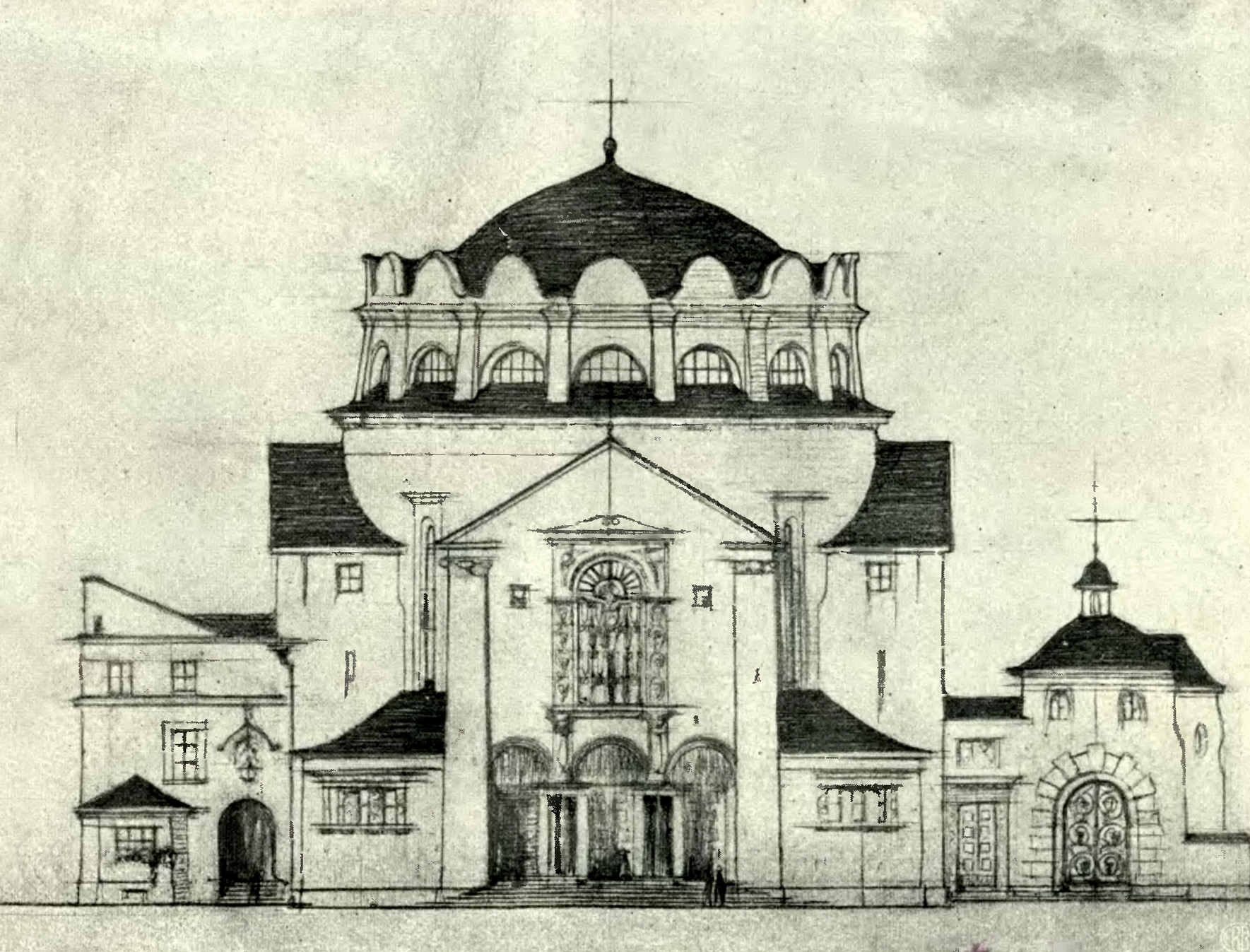
A project of St. Anne's Church by Derdacki and Minkiewicz

== See also ==
- History of Lviv
- Teodor Talowski
- Zygmunt Gorgolewski
