= Paweł Graliński =

Polish architect

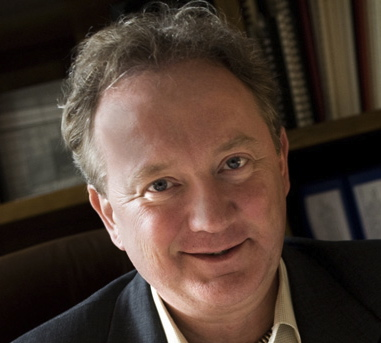
- Paweł Graliński Renowned Polish architect specializing in mixed-use developments, commercial centers, and entertainment complexes in Poland and Europe.
- Born: January 10, 1961 (age 65); Warsaw, Poland
- Education: Warsaw University of Technology
- Occupation: Architect
- Buildings: Sadyba Best Mall in Warsaw

Paweł Wiktor Graliński (born 10 January 1961) is a Polish architect who plans and designs mixed-use developments, as well as commercial and entertainment centers in Poland and Europe.

== Life and career ==
Graliński attended the Warsaw University of Technology at the Faculty of Architecture, studying under the Polish Academy of Sciences. While there, he was involved in the anti-communist opposition and graduated in 1984.

He moved to Oslo, Norway in 1984. From 1986, he led the design office "Andersen, Larsson, Graliński AS" and founded his own design studio in 1988. While in Scandinavia, he designed shopping centers, insurance company headquarters, office buildings, coastal land developments, housing, redevelopment projects, and residential sites.

In 1996, he was invited to design Sadyba Best Mall in Warsaw. In 1997, he founded his architectural firm in Poland, Paweł W. Graliński Arch Magic Assoc. Architects, which deals with investment projects and real estate development. Graliński has designed entertainment projects, university buildings, offices, industrial areas, and residential areas.

Graliński is affiliated with the Association of Norwegian Architects, the Chamber of Architects, the Engineers Chamber of the Republic of Poland, and the Association of Polish Architects.

He lives near Warsaw in a house he designed himself, cultivates a vineyard, and breeds racing dogs.

== Awards and prizes ==
In 2002, the Sadyba Best Mall in Warsaw, which he designed, was recognized by the International Council of Shopping Centers (ICSC) for its design, becoming the first project in Central and Eastern Europe to receive the ICSC award.

He was further recognised for:

- The Most Beautiful Office Building in Ursynów (Viking House, 2000, the prize by the Mayor of Warsaw, District of Ursynów)
- Building of the Year (Punkt 44 entertainment centre in Katowice, Silesia, Poland, 2002, the prize by the Polish Association of Construction Engineers)
- Interior of the Year (Cinema City Toruń, 2004) the Pomerania Marshal award.

== Selected projects ==
Graliński's works

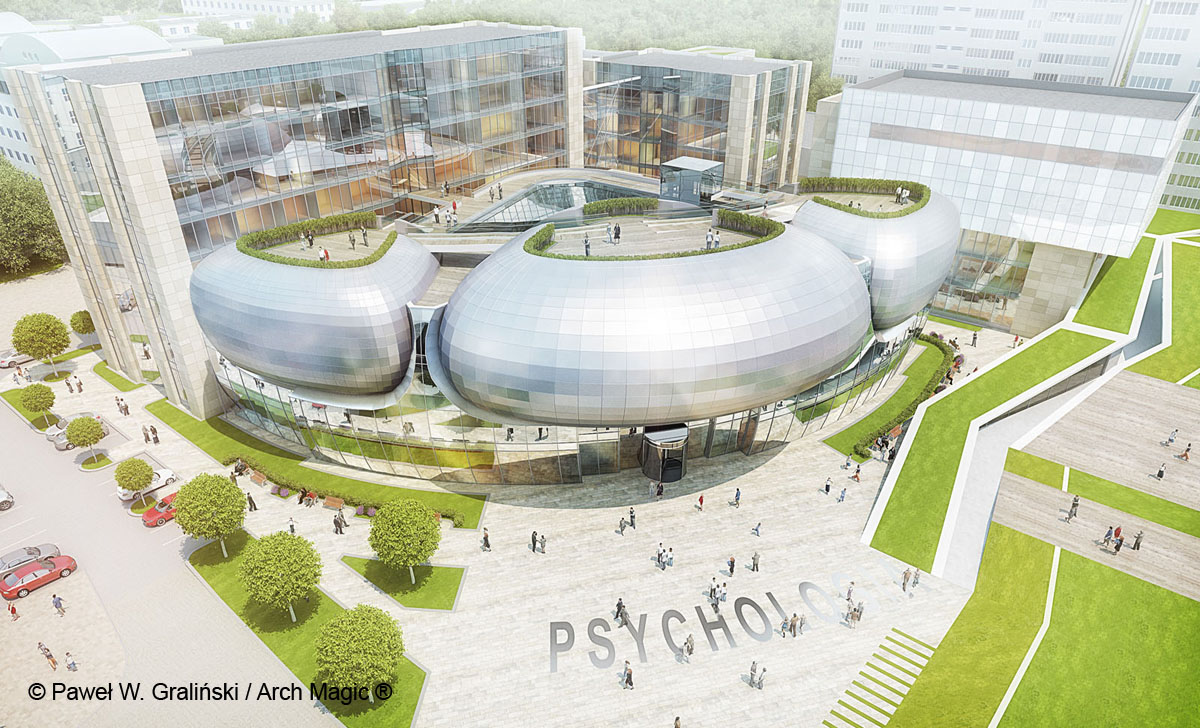
Faculty of Psychology, University of Warsaw

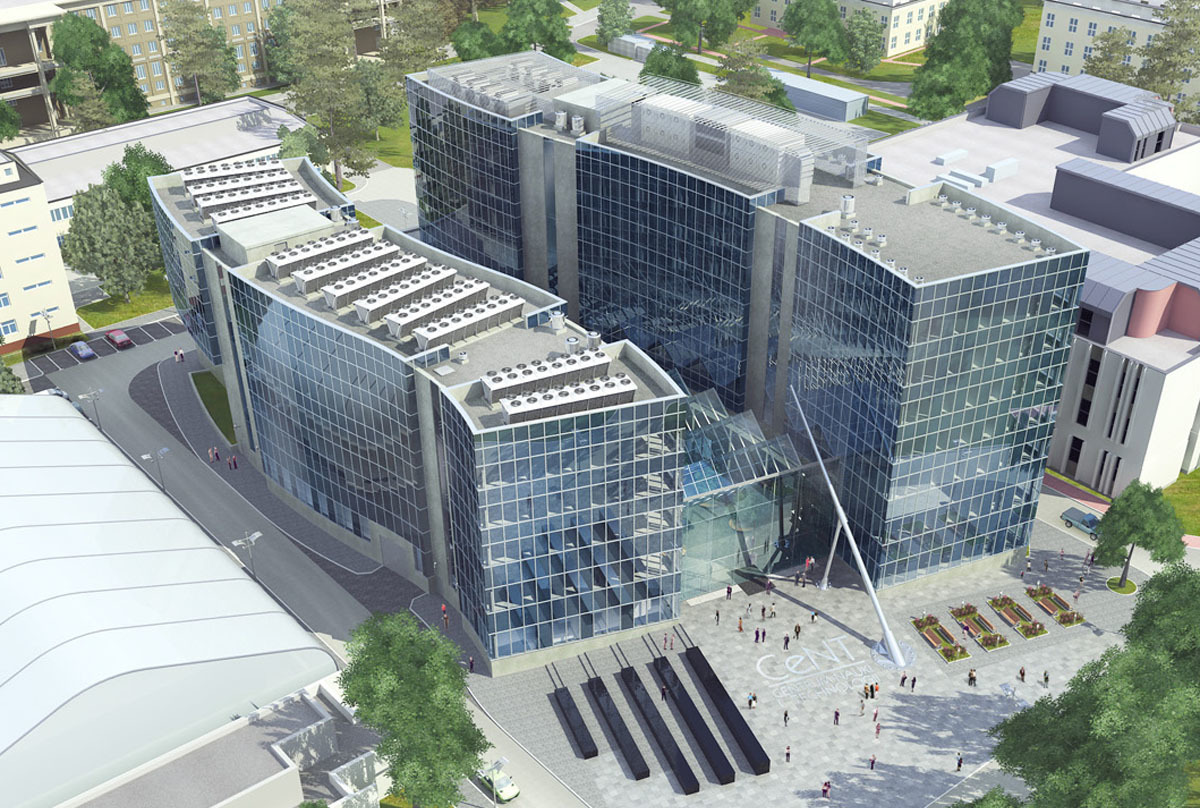
New Technologies Centre, University of Warsaw

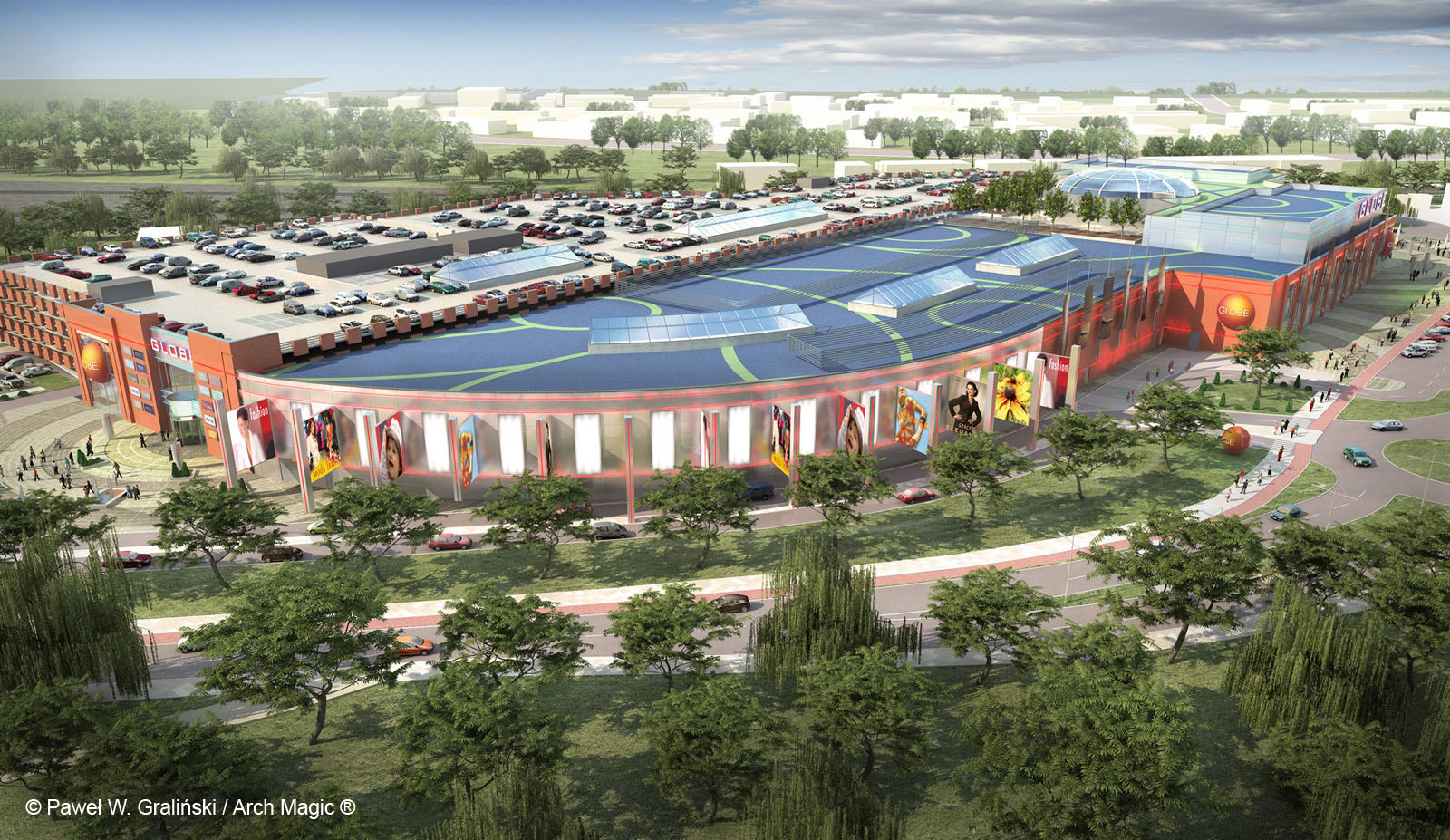
Focus Mall, Piła - Project

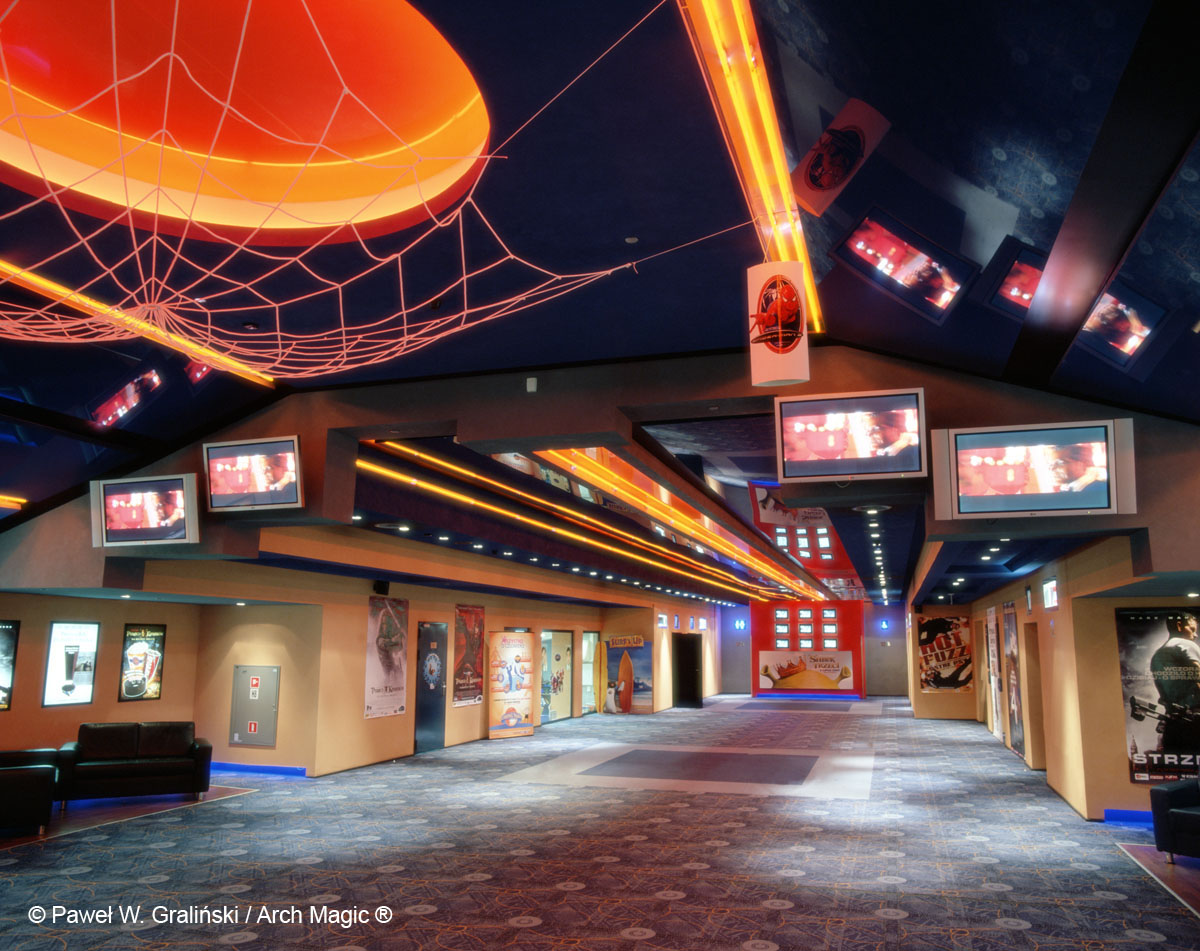
Arkadia shopping mall, Warsaw

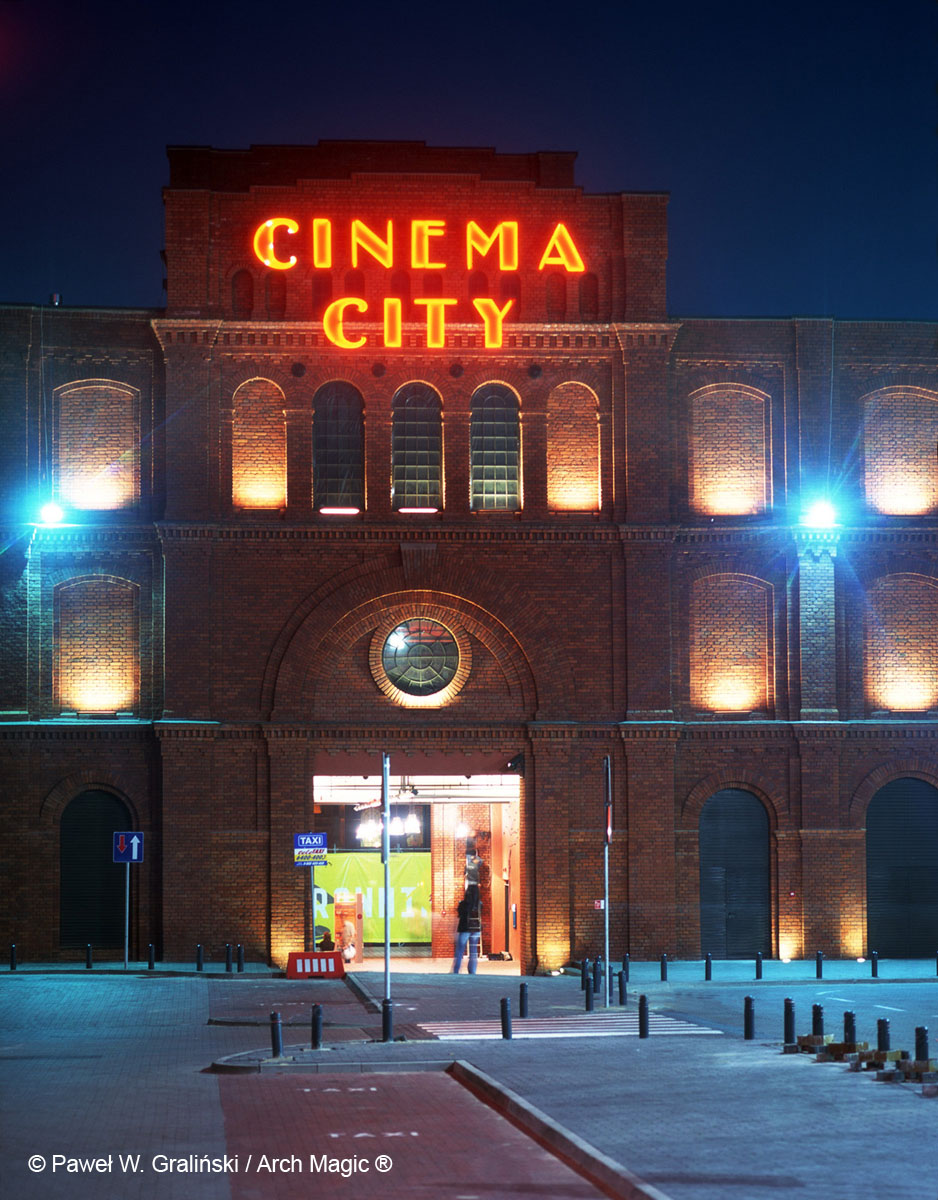
Cinema City, Manufaktura shopping centre, Łódź

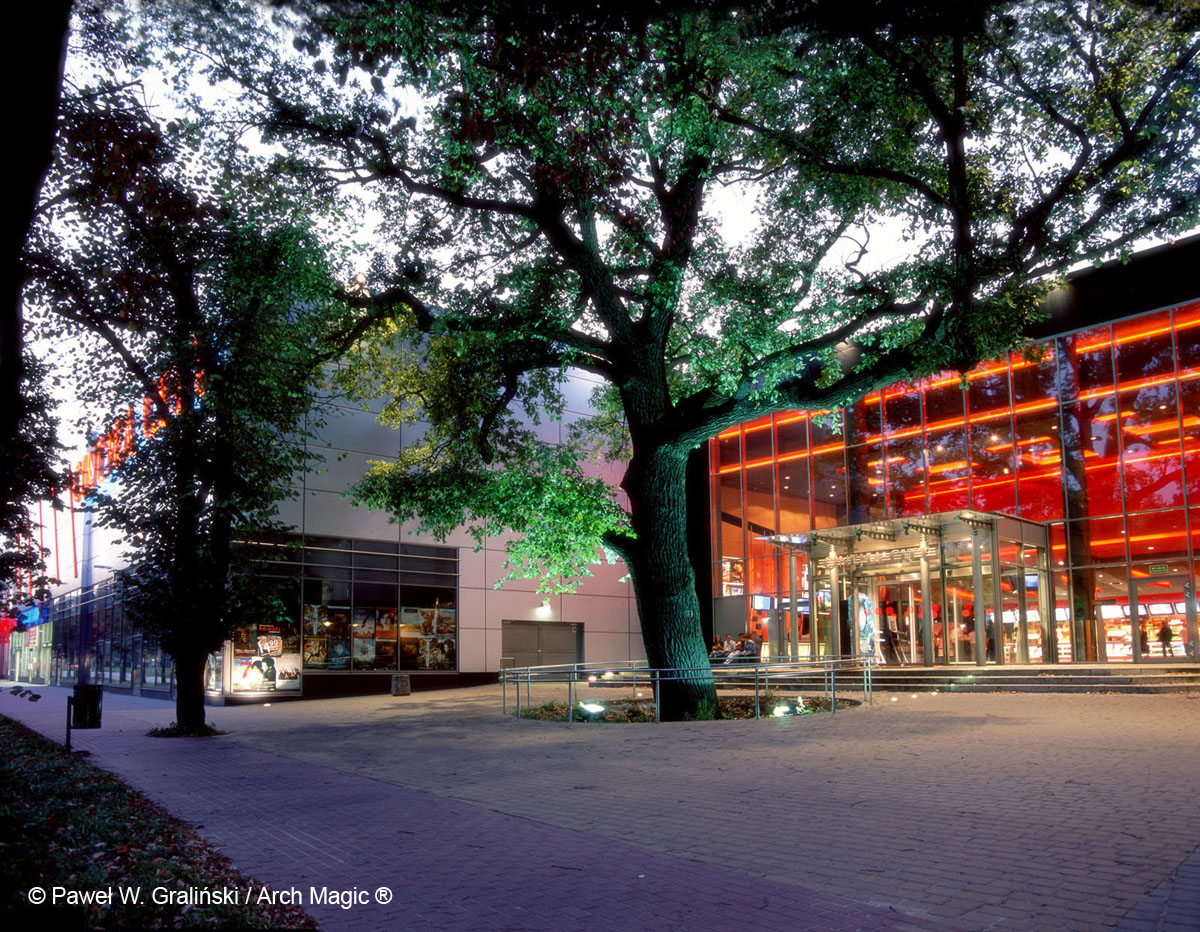
Cinema City, Toruń

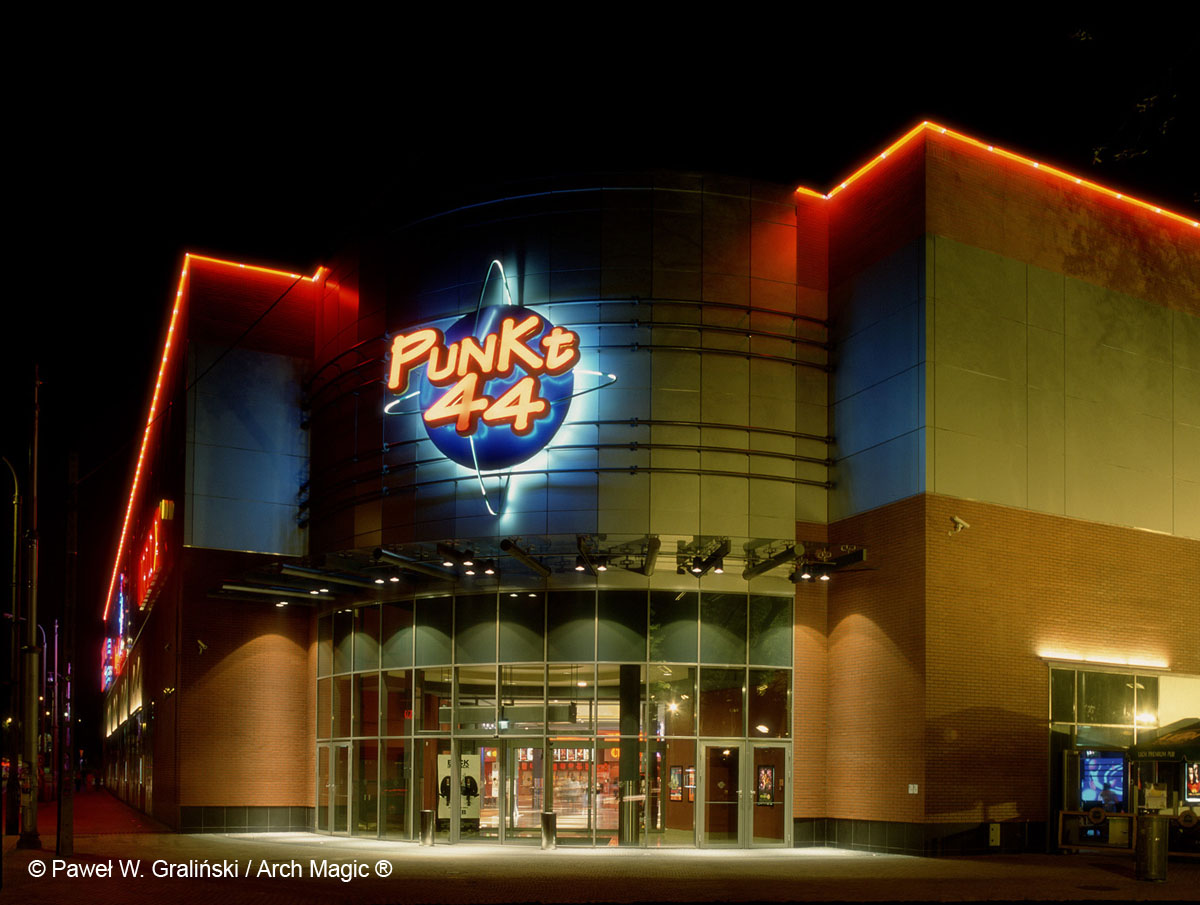
Punkt 44, Katowice

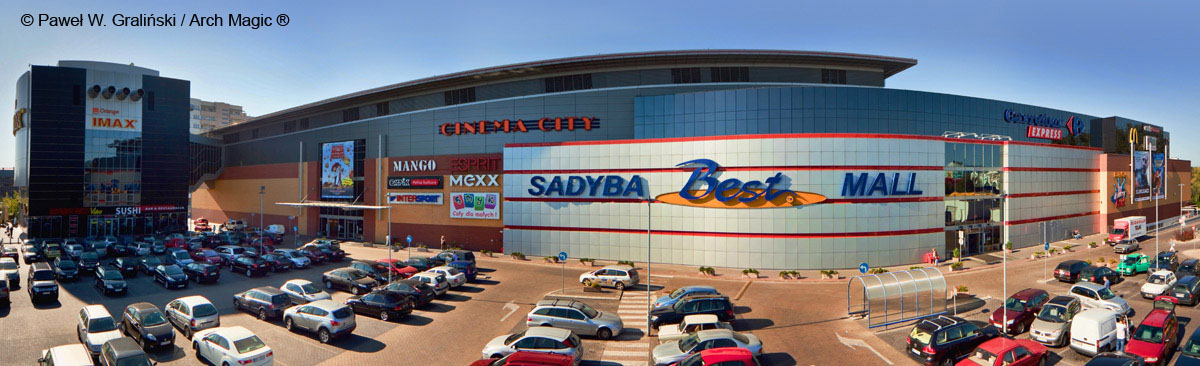
Sadyba Best Mall, Warsaw

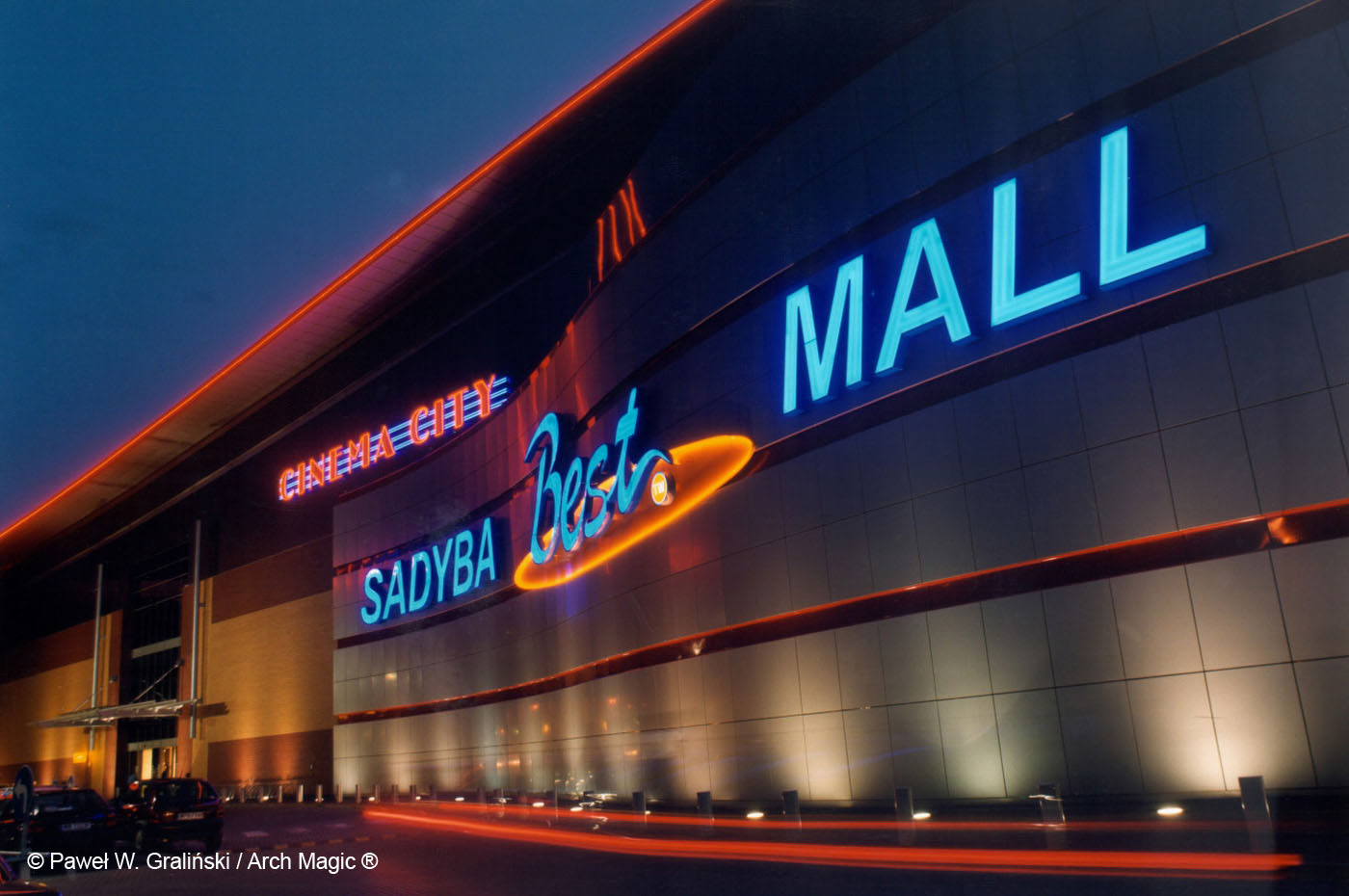
Sadyba Best Mall, Warsaw

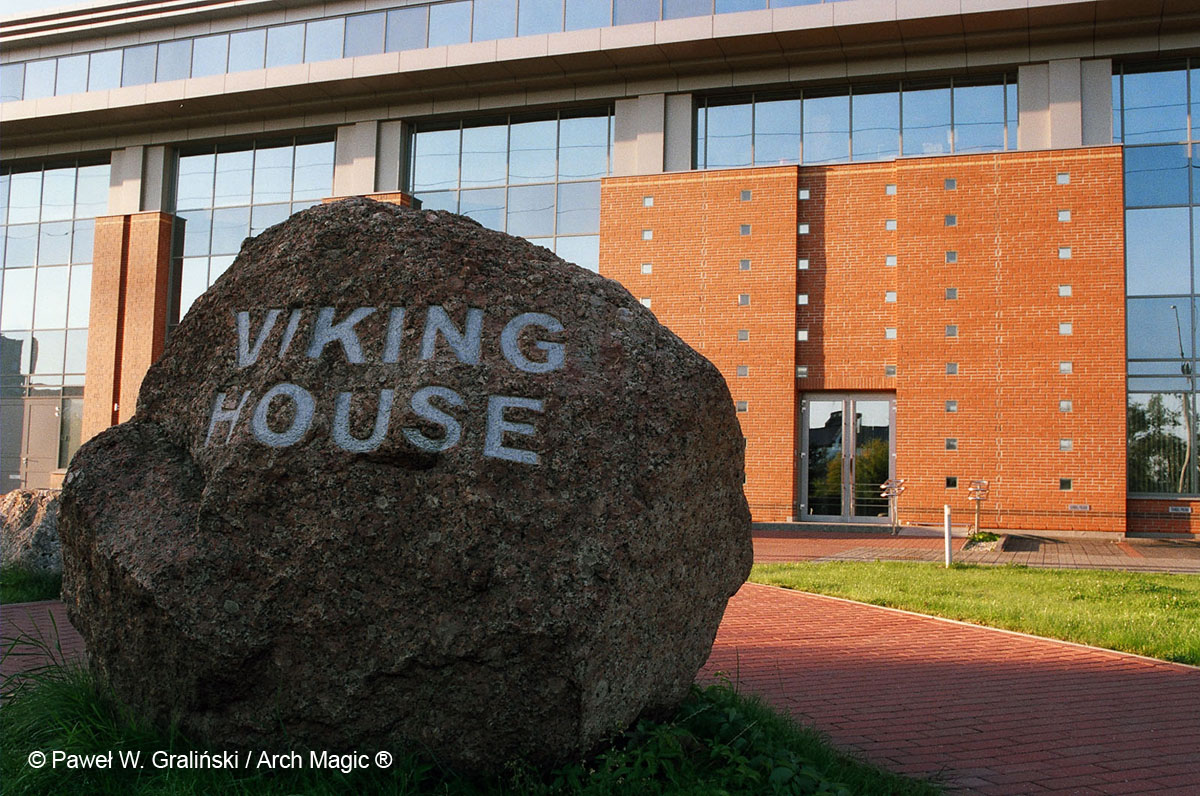
Viking House, office building, Warsaw

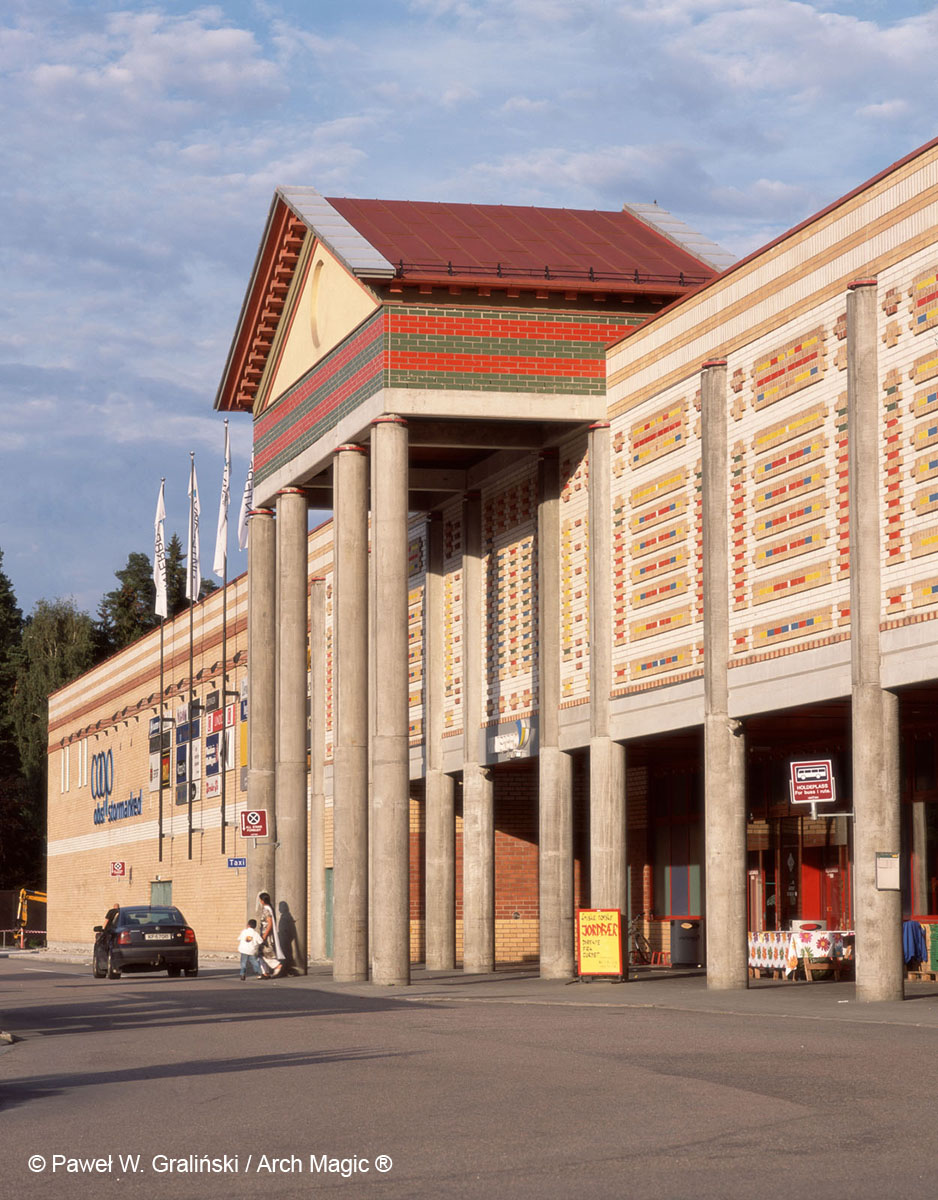
Vinterbro Center, Norway
- Vinterbro Center, Vinterbro, Norway, 1994
- Viking House, Warsaw, 2000
- Sadyba Best Mall, Warsaw, 2000 (first 3D IMAX® theatre in Poland)
- Punkt 44, Katowice (entertainment centre: cinema Multiplex & IMAX®, bowling), 2003
- Cinema City, Toruń, 2004
- Horse Race Apartments, Warsaw, 2005
- Cinema City (IMAX) Manufaktura, Łódź, 2005
- Cinema City Arkadia, Warsaw, 2006
- private residency, Konstancin-Jeziorna, 2006
- Focus Mall, shopping centre, Piła, project
- Centrum Nowych Technologii I (CENT I) University of Warsaw, 2013
- Faculty of Psychology University of Warsaw, project
- Vogla square, Warsaw– Wilanów, project
