= Zarur =

Zarur may refer to:

- Giselle Zarur (born 1987), Mexican sports journalist and television reporter
- Guillermo Zarur (1932–2011), Mexican actor
- Zarur, Iran
