= Zaur Kaziev =

Russian footballer (1983–2024)

Personal information
- Full name: Zaur Mauladinovich Kaziev
- Date of birth: 30 August 1983
- Place of birth: Mozdok, North Ossetian ASSR, Russian SFSR, USSR
- Date of death: December 2024 (aged 41)
- Height: 1.82 m (6 ft 0 in)
- Position: Forward

Senior career*
Years	Team	Apps	(Gls)
2002	FC Mozdok	8	(0)
2006	FC Spartak Vladikavkaz	13	(1)
2007–2008	Dinaburg Daugavpils		
2009–2010	FC Sheksna Cherepovets	33	(9)
2010	FC Spartak Mozdok (D4)		
2011–2012	FC Sheksna Cherepovets	39	(6)
2012	FC Dolgoprudny	13	(0)
2014	FC Znamya Truda Orekhovo-Zuyevo	8	(0)
2014	FC TSK Simferopol	2	(0)
- * Club domestic league appearances and goals

Zaur Mauladinovich Kaziev (Russian: Заур Мауладинович Казиев; 30 August 1983 – December 2024) was a Russian footballer who played as a forward. He died in December 2024, at the age of 41.
