= Jan Zaor =

- Occupation: Architect

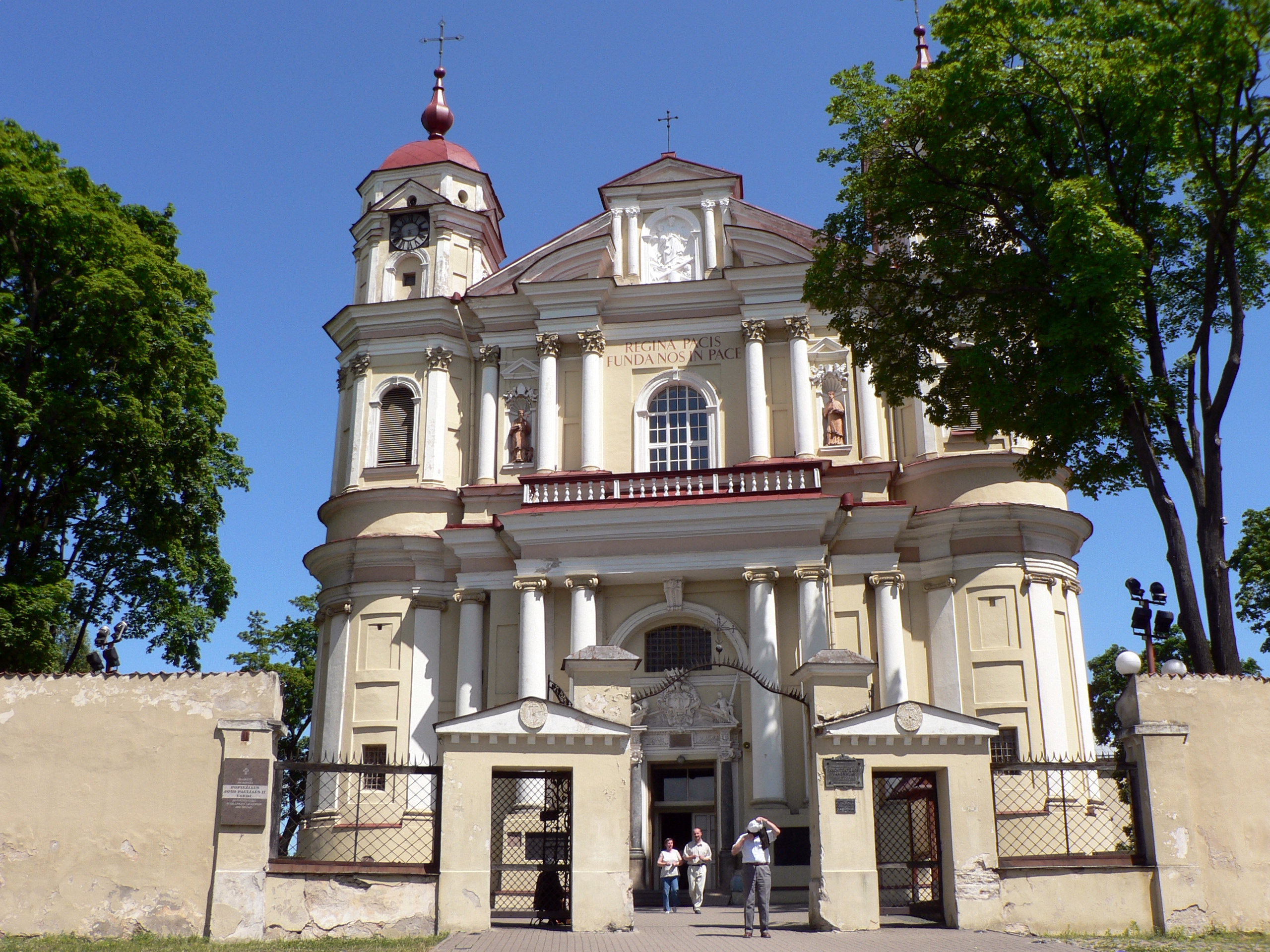
St. Peter and St. Paul church in Vilnius, Lithuania designed by Zaor

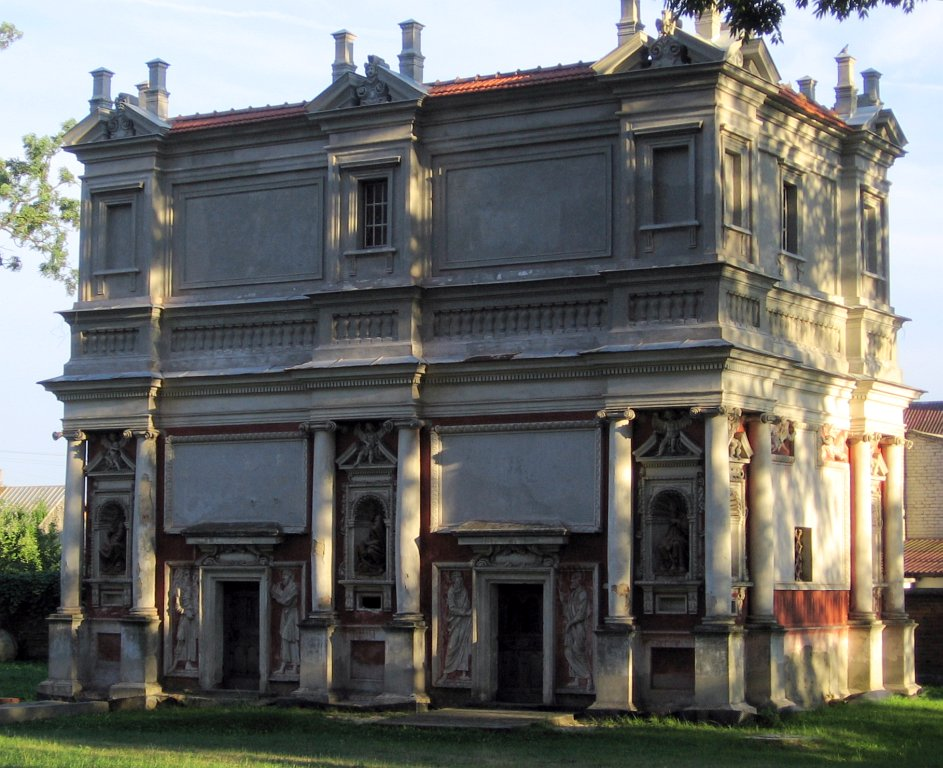
The Santa Casa in Gołąb

Jan Zaor (Zaur, Zaorowicz) was a Polish baroque architect from Kraków who lived in the 17th century and was active from 1638 to 1676. He is known for designing St. Peter and St. Paul's Church, Vilnius (1668–1676).

== Works ==
He began designing in about 1638, when he worked on The Santa Casa (domek loretański) in Gołąb. He also designed and/or supervised the following buildings:

- The Parish Church of the Holy Trinity in Tarłów (mid-17th century)
- The Royal chapel in the church of Kazimierz Dolny (1653)
- Pažaislis church (1672–1674)
- St. Peter and St. Paul's Church, Vilnius (1668–1676)
